= Outline of Stockholm =

Overview of and topical guide to Stockholm

Coat of arms of Stockholm

The following outline is provided as an overview of and topical guide to Stockholm:

Stockholm –

== General reference ==
- Pronunciation: English: /ˈstɒkhoʊ(l)m/, Swedish: [ˈstɔ̂kːhɔlm] or [ˈstɔ̂kːɔlm]
- Common English name(s): Stockholm
- Official English name(s): Stockholm
- Adjectival(s): Stockholmer
- Demonym(s): Stockholmer

== Geography of Stockholm ==
Geography of Stockholm

- Stockholm is:
  - a city
    - capital of Sweden
- Population of Stockholm: 949,761
- Area of Stockholm: 188 km^{2} (73 sq mi)

Stockholm
- Location within Europe
- Coordinates: 59°19′46″N 18°4′7″E

=== Location of Stockholm ===
- Stockholm is situated within the following regions:
  - Northern Hemisphere and Eastern Hemisphere
    - Eurasia
      - Europe (outline)
        - Northern Europe
          - Sweden (outline)
            - Stockholm County
- Time zone(s):
  - Central European Time (UTC+01)
    - In Summer (DST): Central European Summer Time (UTC+02)

=== Environment of Stockholm ===
- Climate of Stockholm

==== Natural geographic features of Stockholm ====
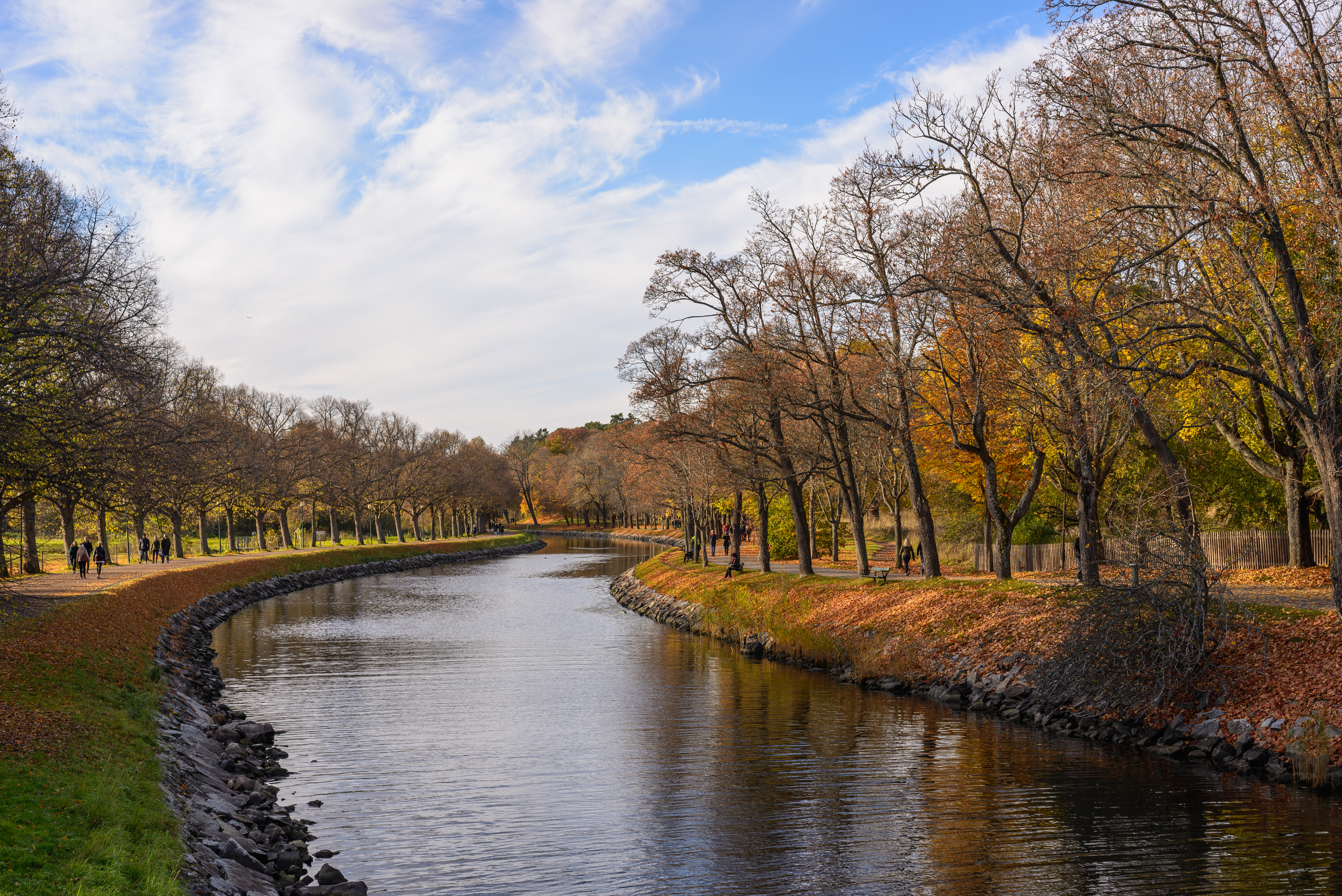
Djurgårdsbrunnskanalen

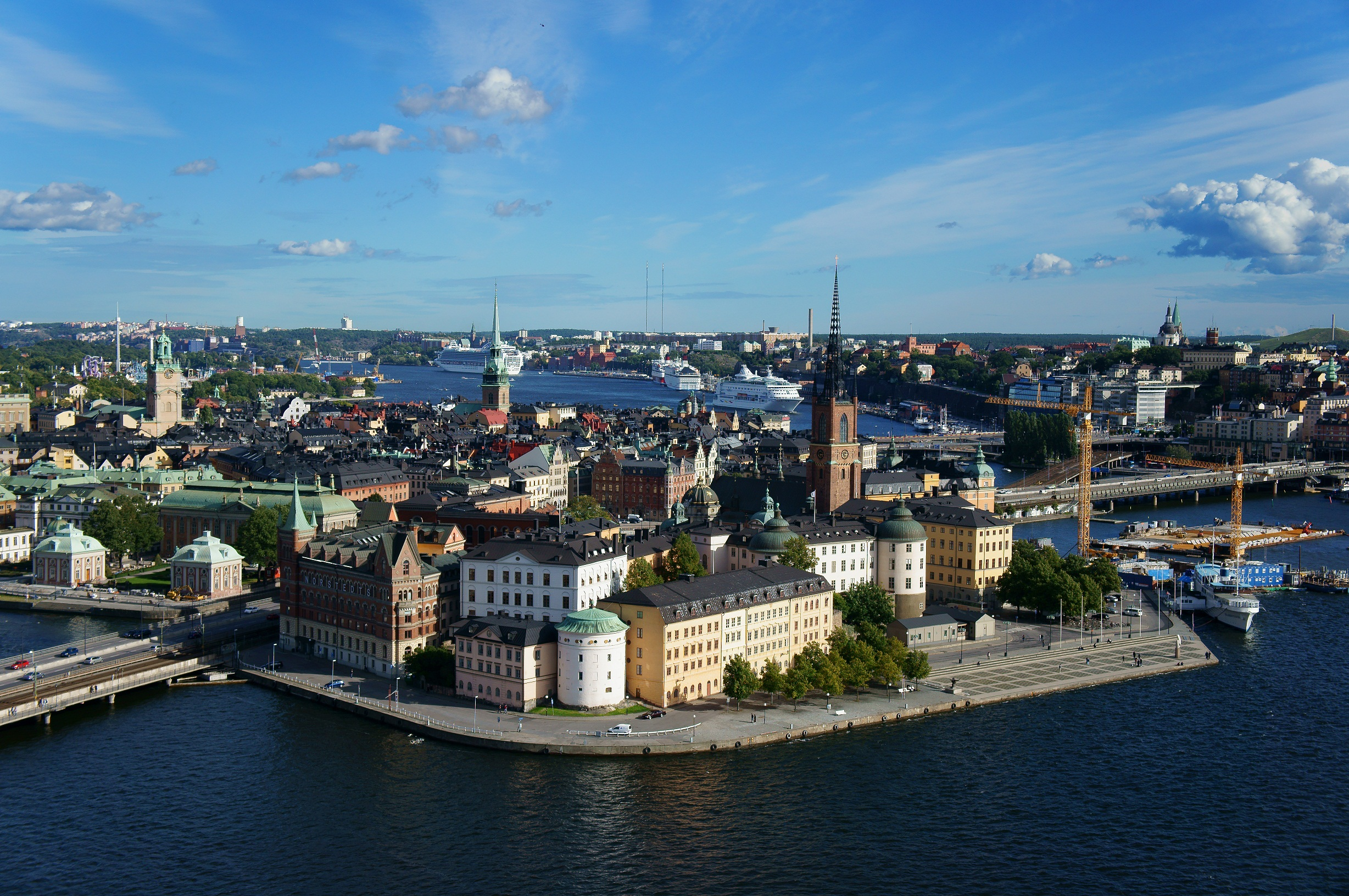
Riddarholmen island

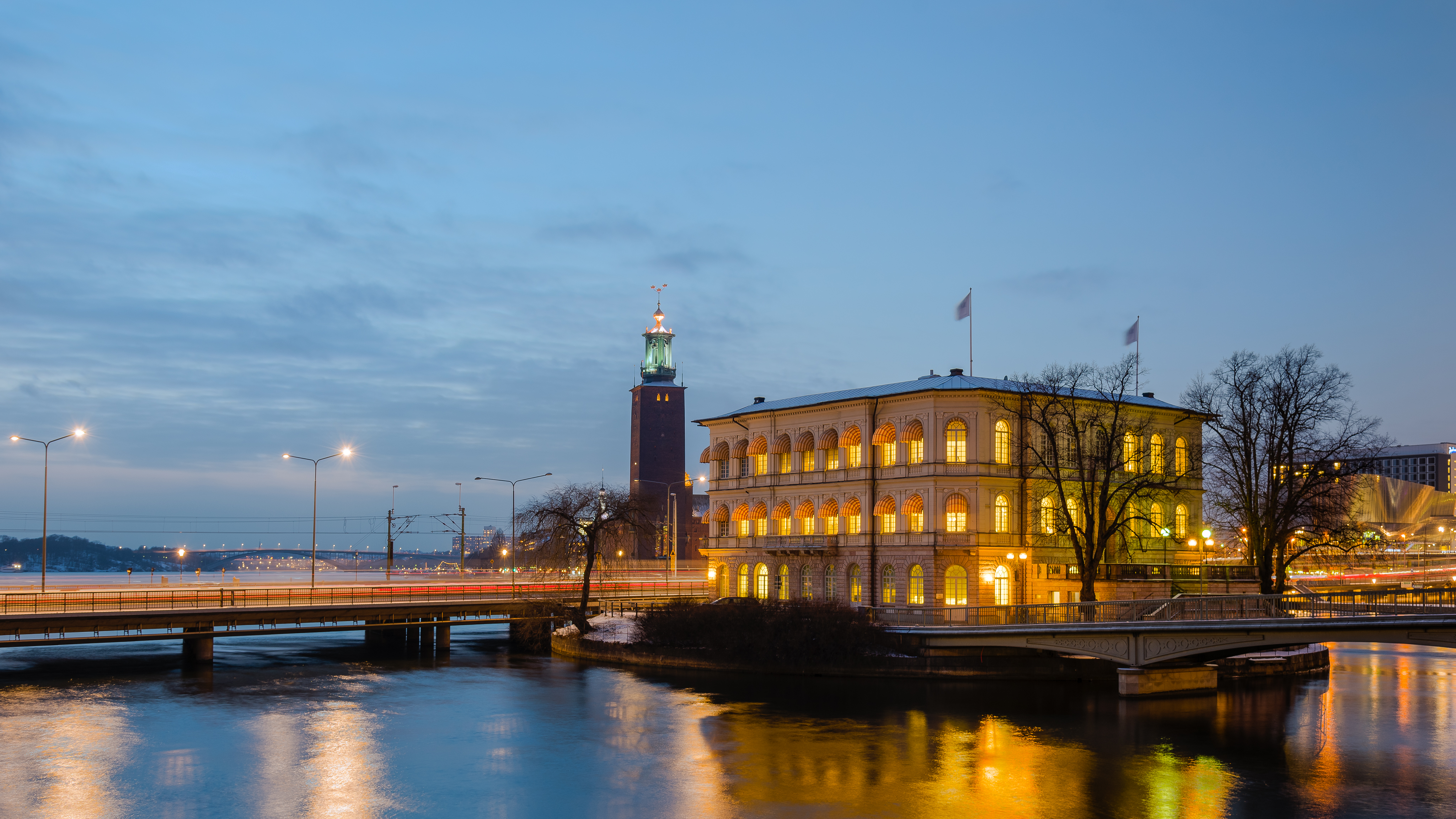
Strömsborg

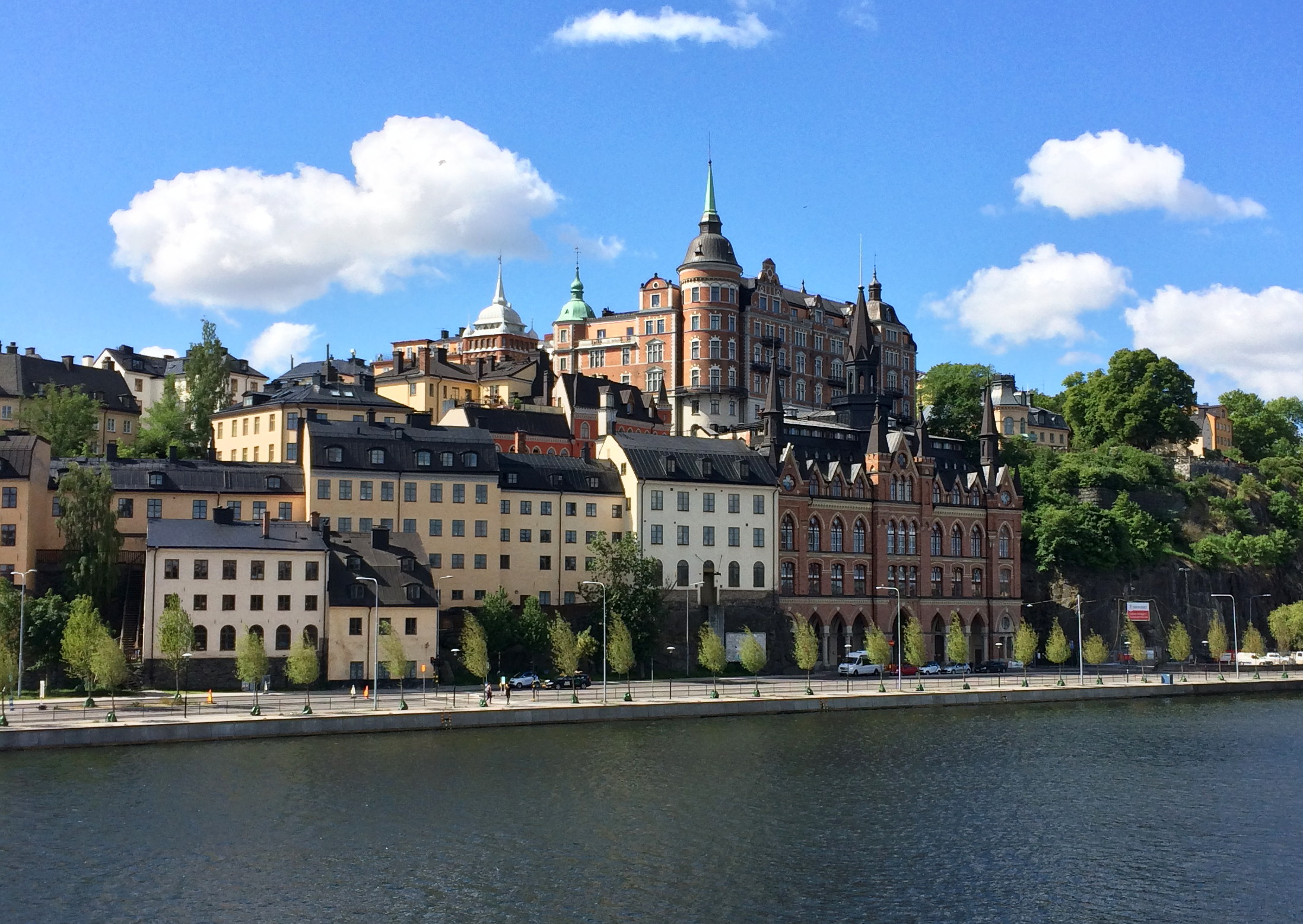
Södermalm island

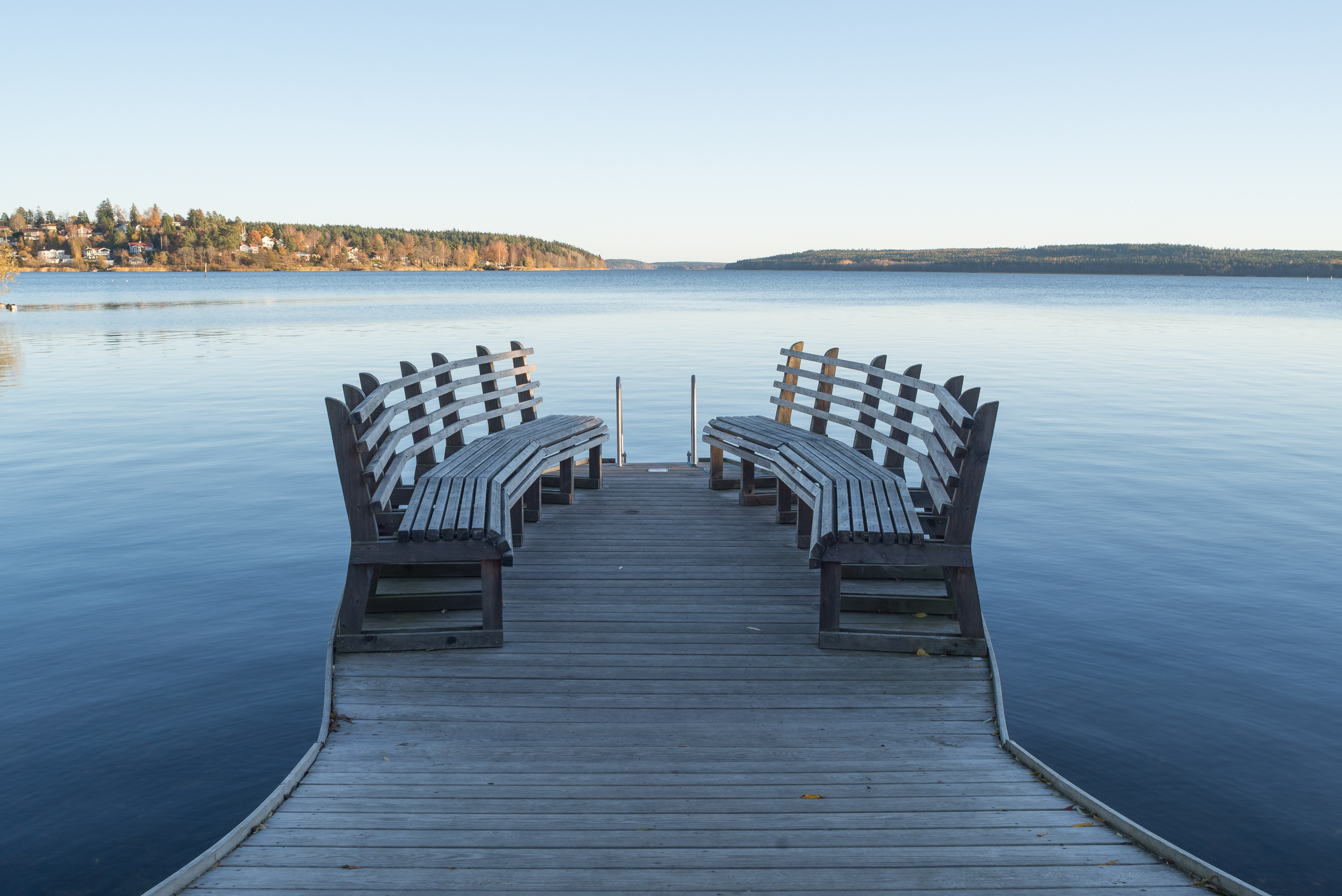
Lake Mälaren

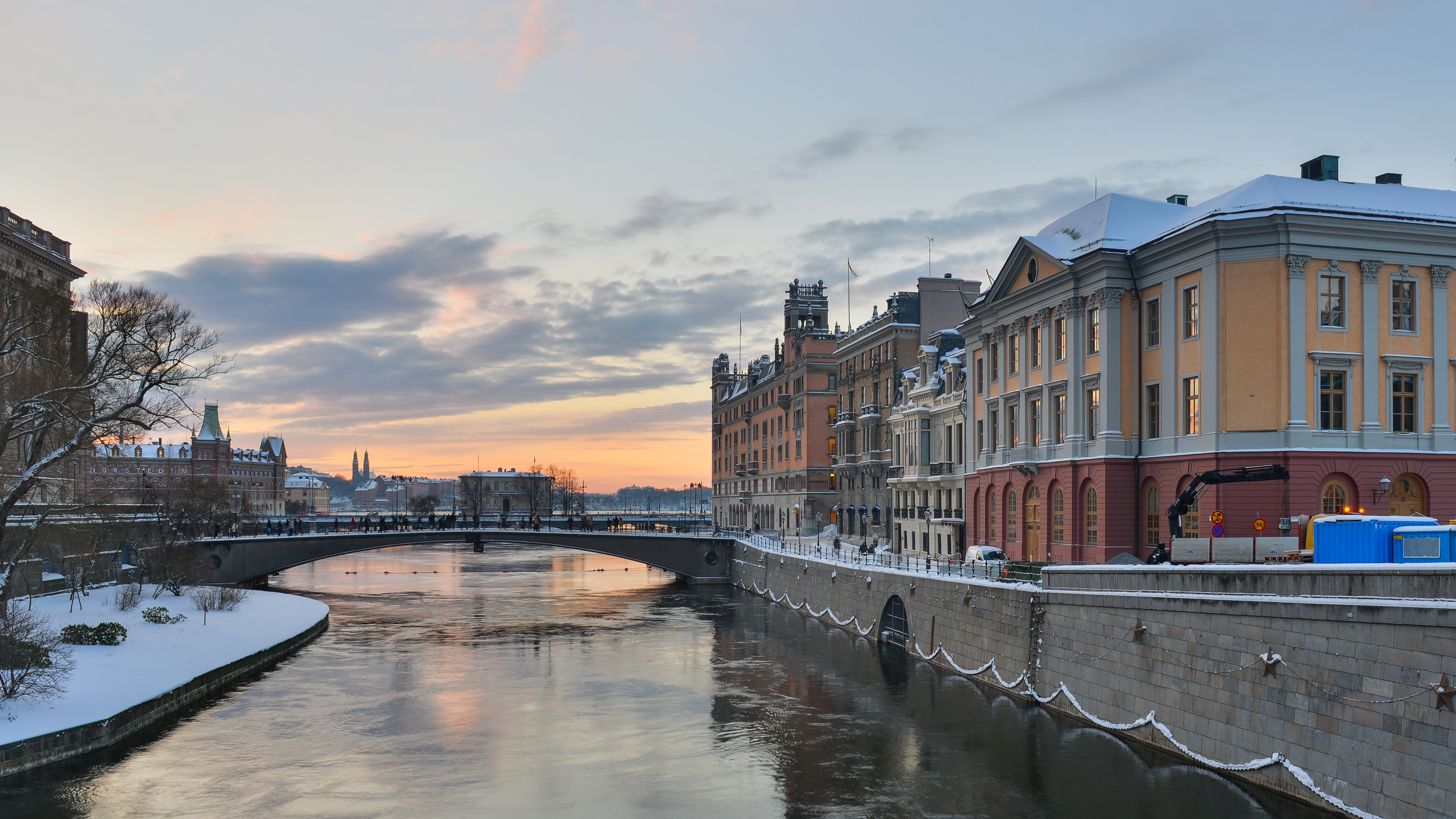
The Norrström river

- Archipelagos in Stockholm
  - Stockholm archipelago
- Bays in Stockholm
  - Djurgårdsbrunnsviken
  - Nybroviken
  - Riddarfjärden
  - Saltsjön
    - Stockholms ström
- Beaches in Stockholm
  - Kanaanbadet
- Canals in Stockholm
  - Djurgårdsbrunnskanalen
  - Hammarby Sjö
  - Klara Sjö
  - Karlbergskanalen
- Islands in Stockholm
  - Beckholmen
  - Djurgården
  - Helgeandsholmen
  - Kastellholmen
  - Kungsholmen
  - Lilla Essingen
  - Långholmen
  - Reimersholme
  - Riddarholmen
  - Skeppsholmen
  - Stadsholmen
  - Stora Essingen
  - Strömsborg
  - Södermalm
- Lakes in Stockholm
  - Brunnsviken
  - Isbladskärret
  - Mälaren
  - Trekanten
- Rivers in Stockholm
  - Kräppladiket
  - Norrström
  - Söderström
- Straits in Stockholm
  - Lilla Värtan
  - Vårbyfjärden

=== Areas of Stockholm ===
- Stockholm City Centre
- South Stockholm
- West Stockholm

==== Districts of Stockholm ====
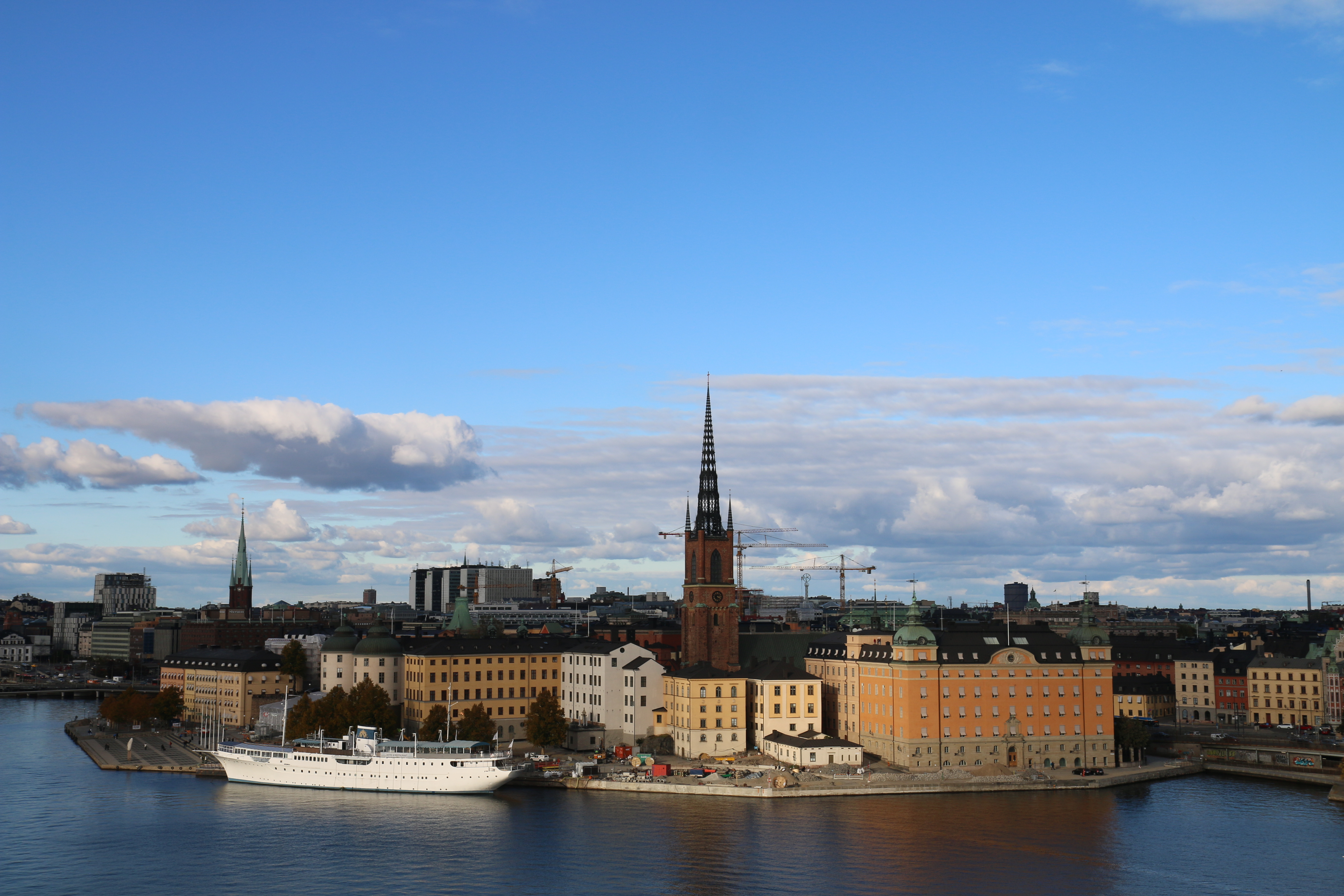
Riddarholmen, part of Gamla stan

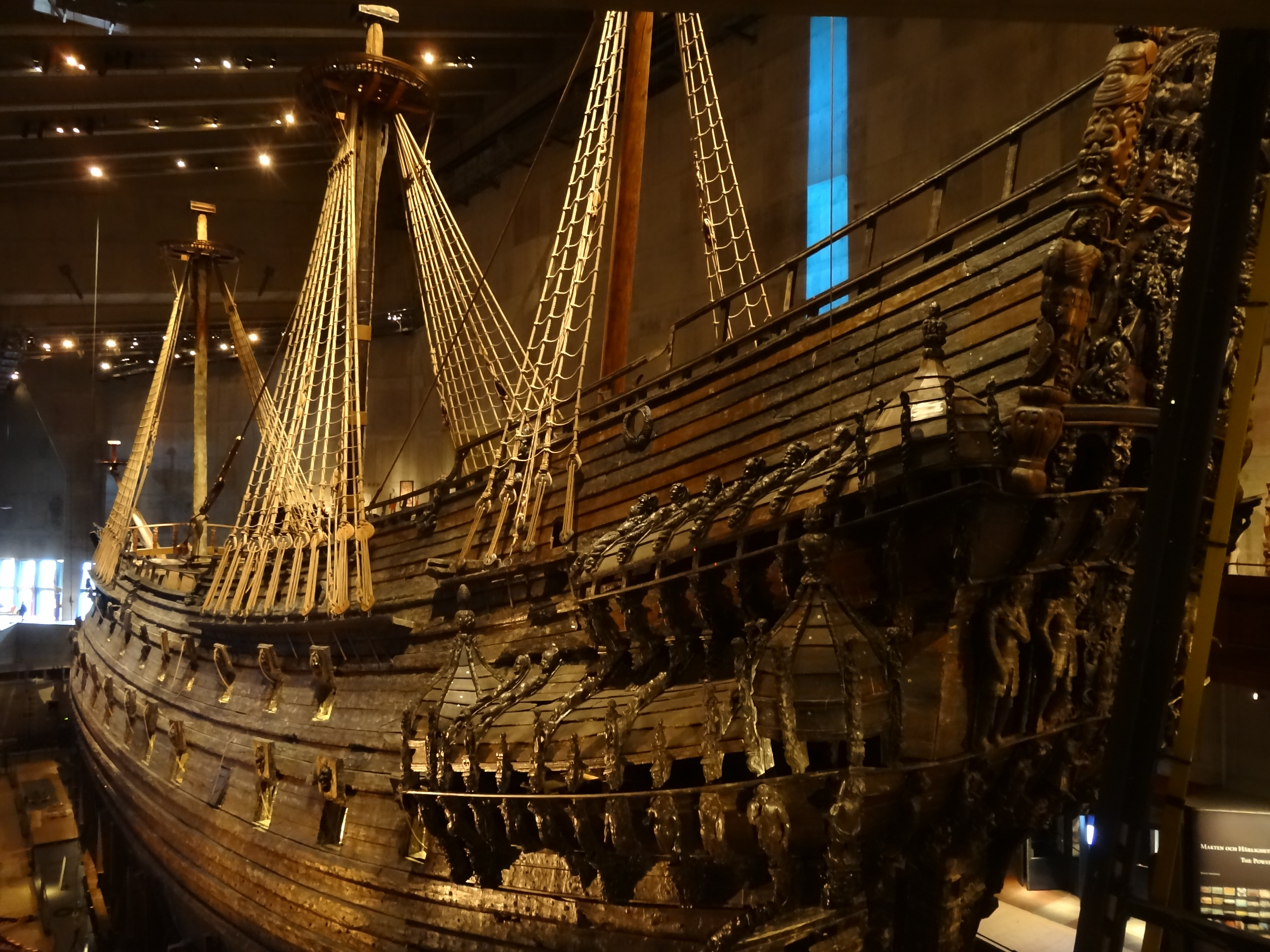
Vasa (ship) at the Vasa Museum, a most popular tourist attraction

- Gamla stan
- Gärdet
- Norrmalm
- Östermalm
- Södermalm
- Vasastan

==== Neighbourhoods in Stockholm ====
- Diplomatstaden
- Helgalunden
- Lärkstaden
- Slussenområdet

=== Locations in Stockholm ===
- Tourist attractions in Stockholm
  - Museums in Stockholm
  - Shopping areas and markets

==== Bridges in Stockholm ====
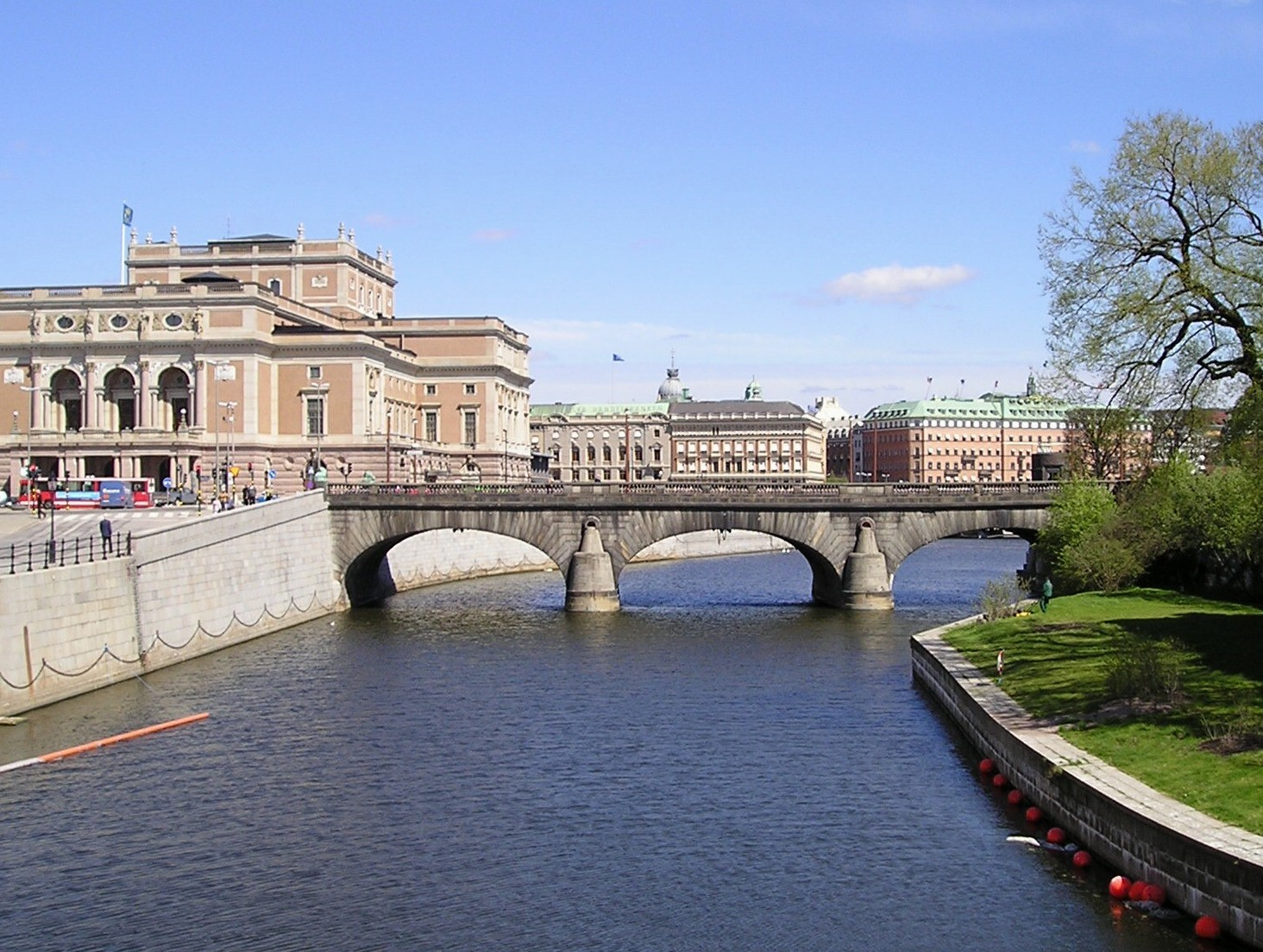
The Norrbro bridge

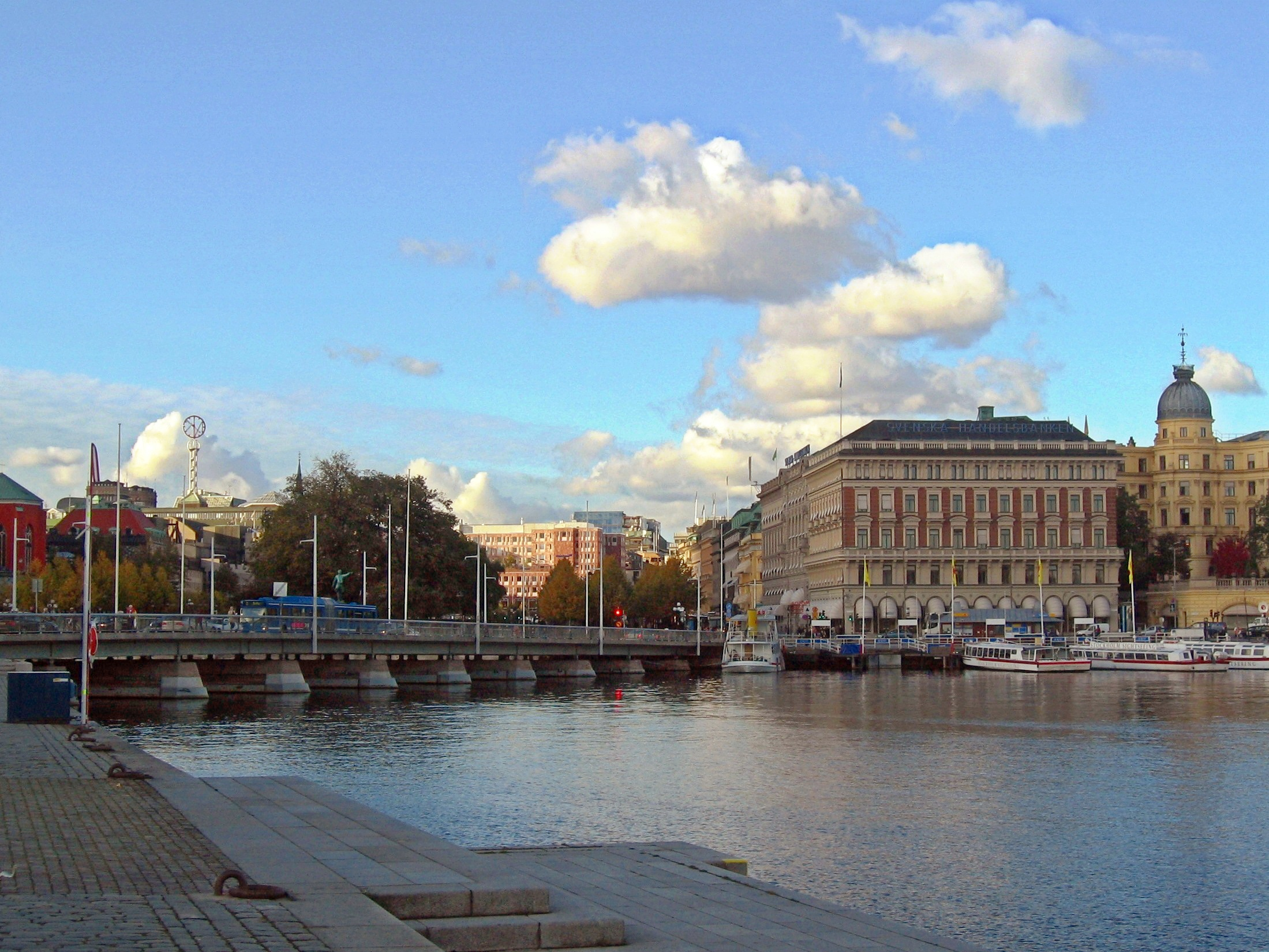
Strömbron

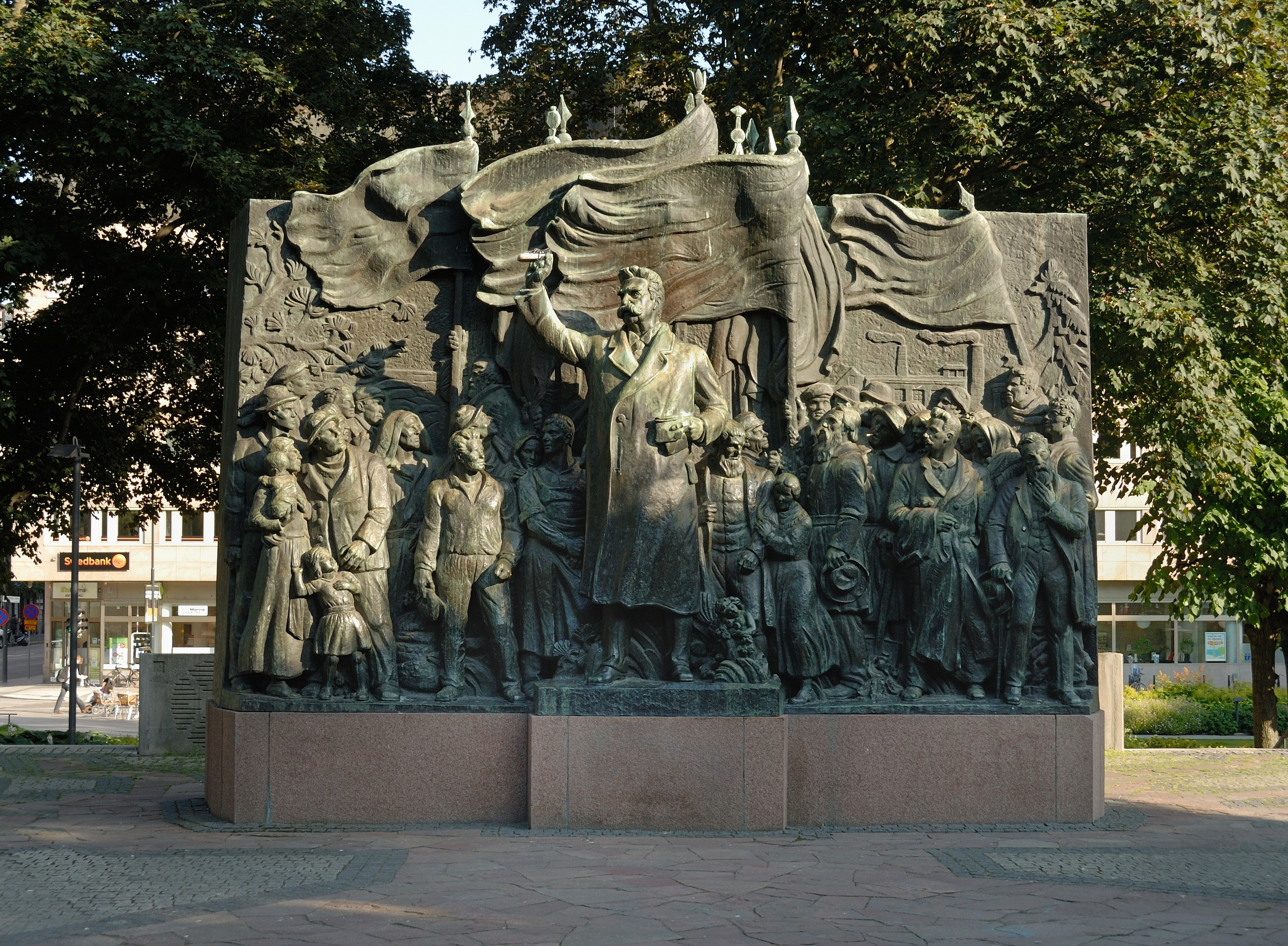
The Branting Monument

Bridges in Stockholm

- Bridge of Regeringsgatan
- Centralbron
- Djurgårdsbron
- Kungsbron
- Liljeholmsbron
- Norrbro
- Riksbron
- Sicklauddsbron
- Skeppsholmsbron
- Stallbron
- Strömbron
- Tranebergsbron
- Vasabron
- Västerbron

==== Cultural and exhibition centres in Stockholm ====
- The House of Culture

==== Fountains in Stockholm ====
- Fountains and ponds of Stockholm

==== Monuments and memorials in Stockholm ====
- Aviator Monument
- Obelisk at Slottsbacken
- The Branting Monument

==== Museums and art galleries in Stockholm ====
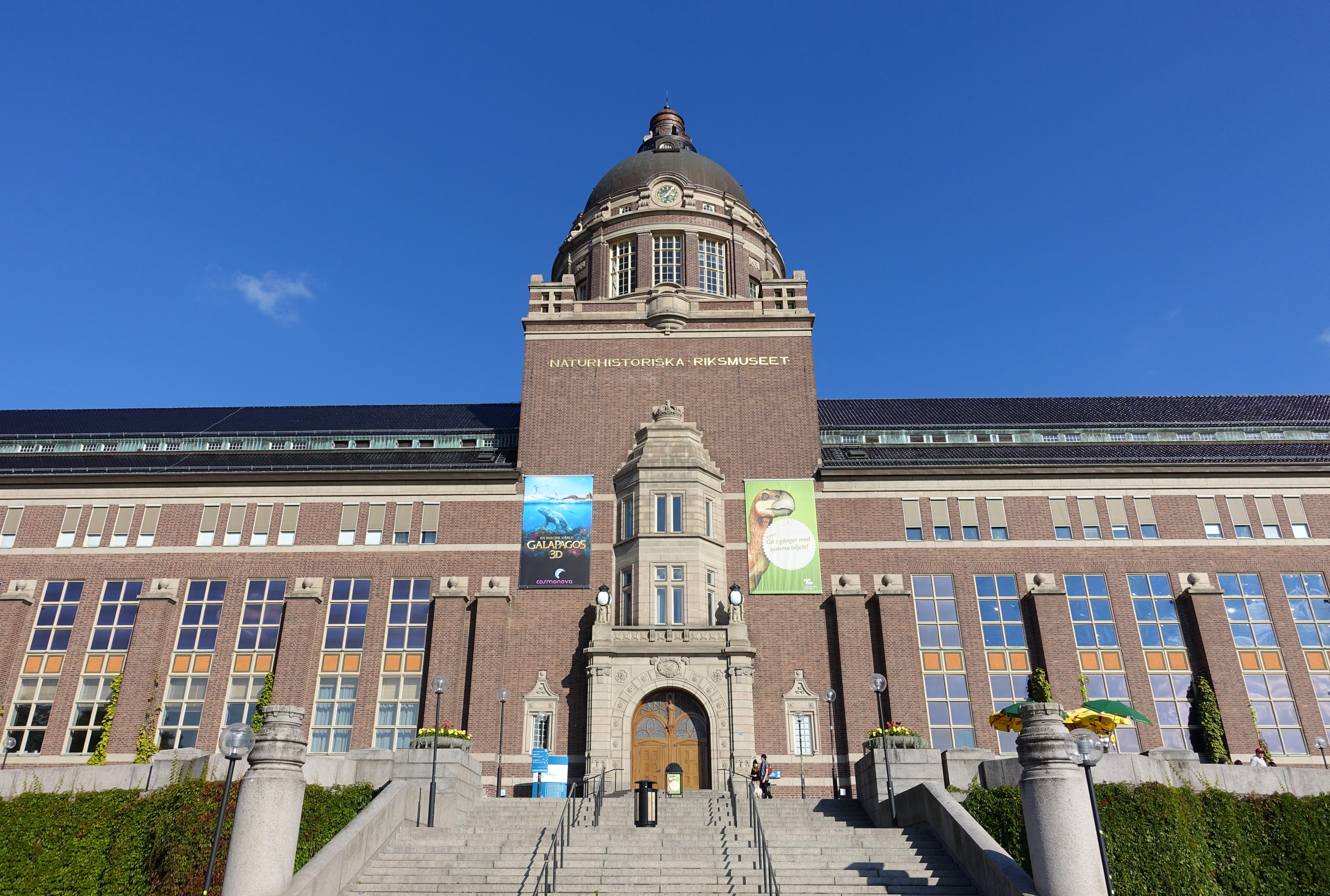
Swedish Museum of Natural History

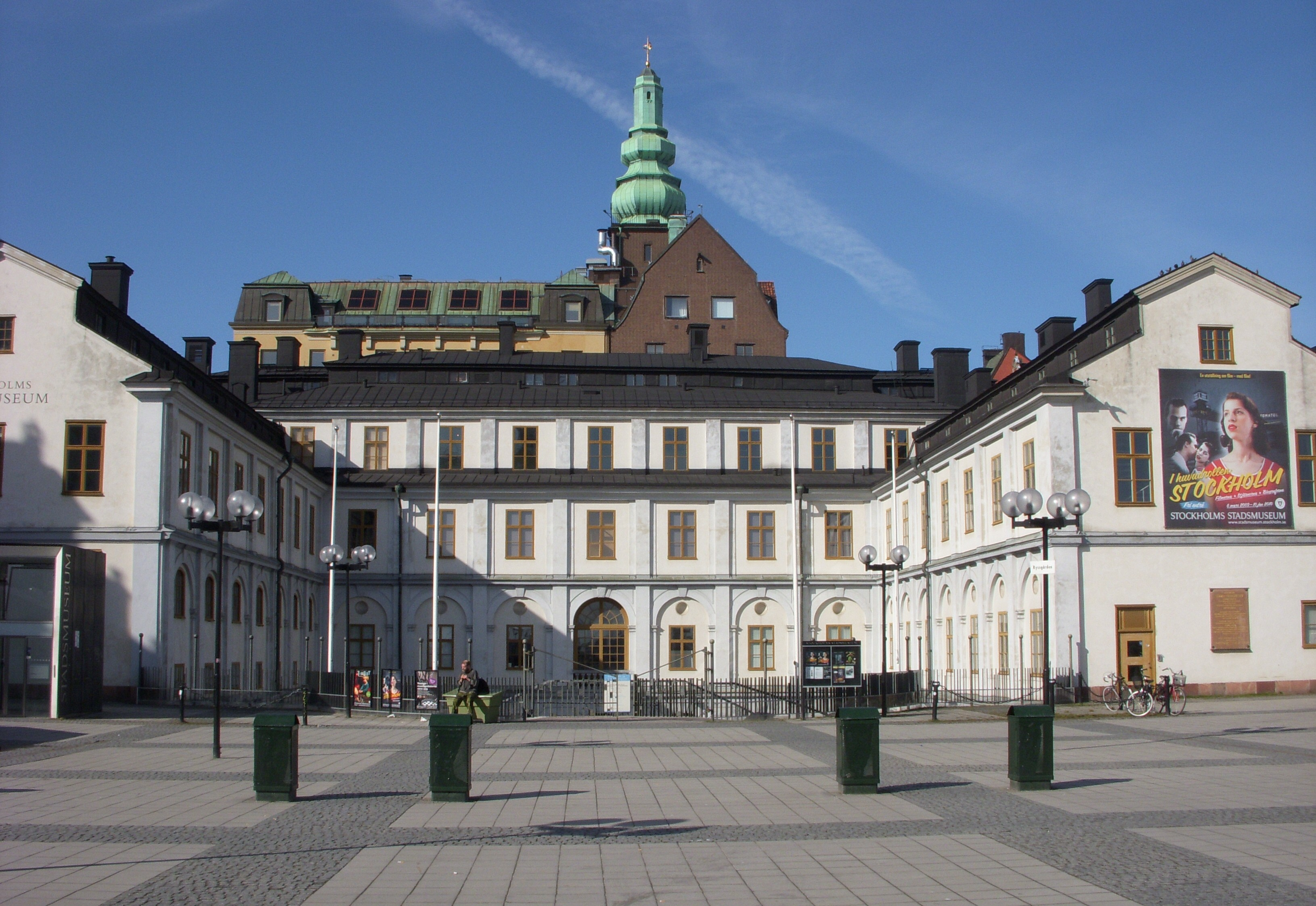
Stockholm City Museum

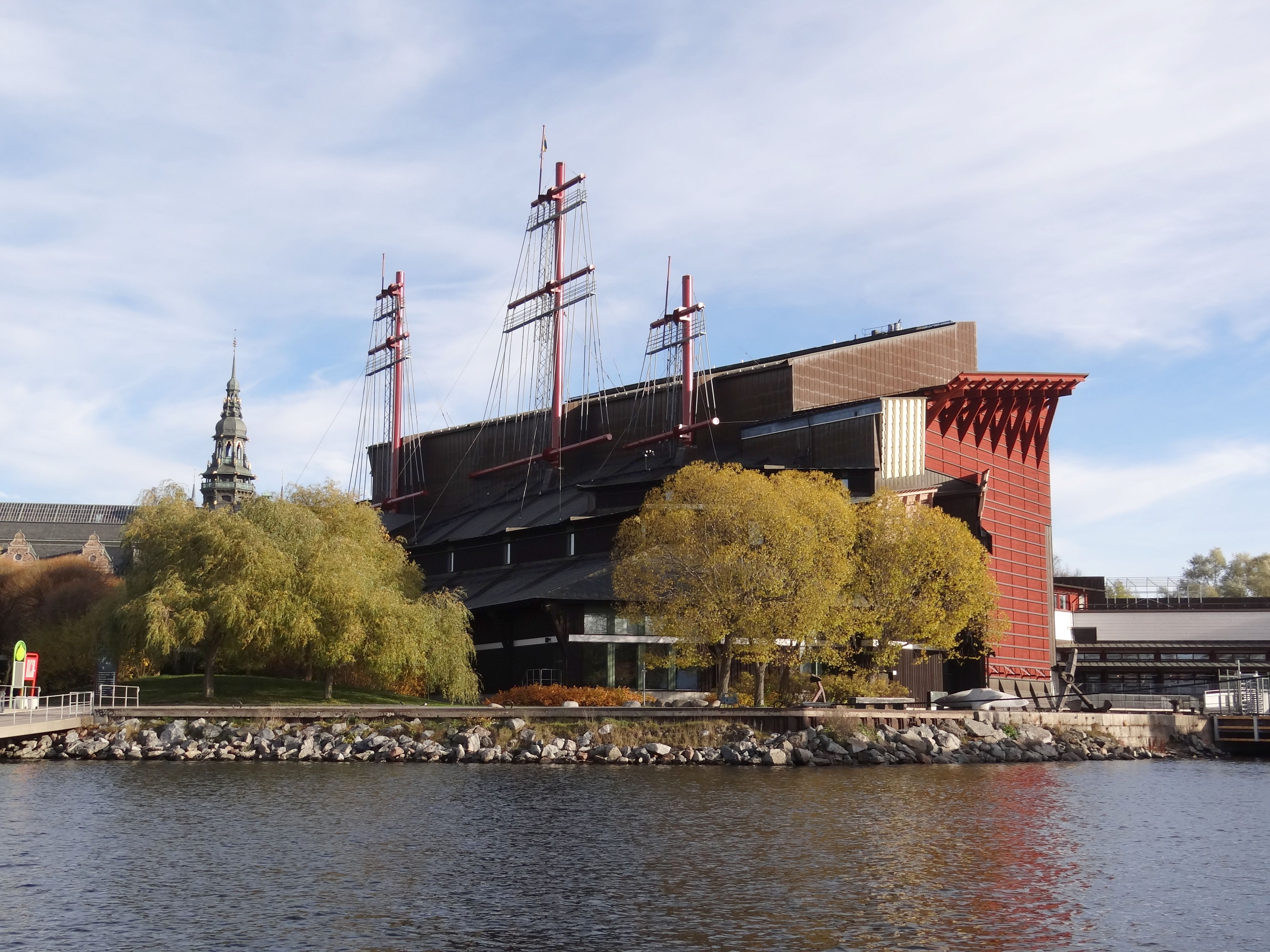
Vasa Museum

Museums in Stockholm

- Artipelag
- Dansmuseet
- Gummeson Gallery
- Hallwyl Museum
- Livrustkammaren
- Maritime Museum
- Millesgården
- Milliken Gallery
- Moderna Museet
- Museum of Ethnography
- Museum of Medieval Stockholm
- Nationalmuseum
- Nordic Museum
- Royal Coin Cabinet
- Stockholm City Museum
- Stockholm Music Museum
- Swedish Army Museum
- Swedish Centre for Architecture and Design
- Swedish History Museum
- Swedish Museum of Natural History
- Swedish National Museum of Science and Technology
- Thiel Gallery
- Vasa Museum
  - Vasa (ship)
- Waldemarsudde

==== Palaces and villas in Stockholm ====
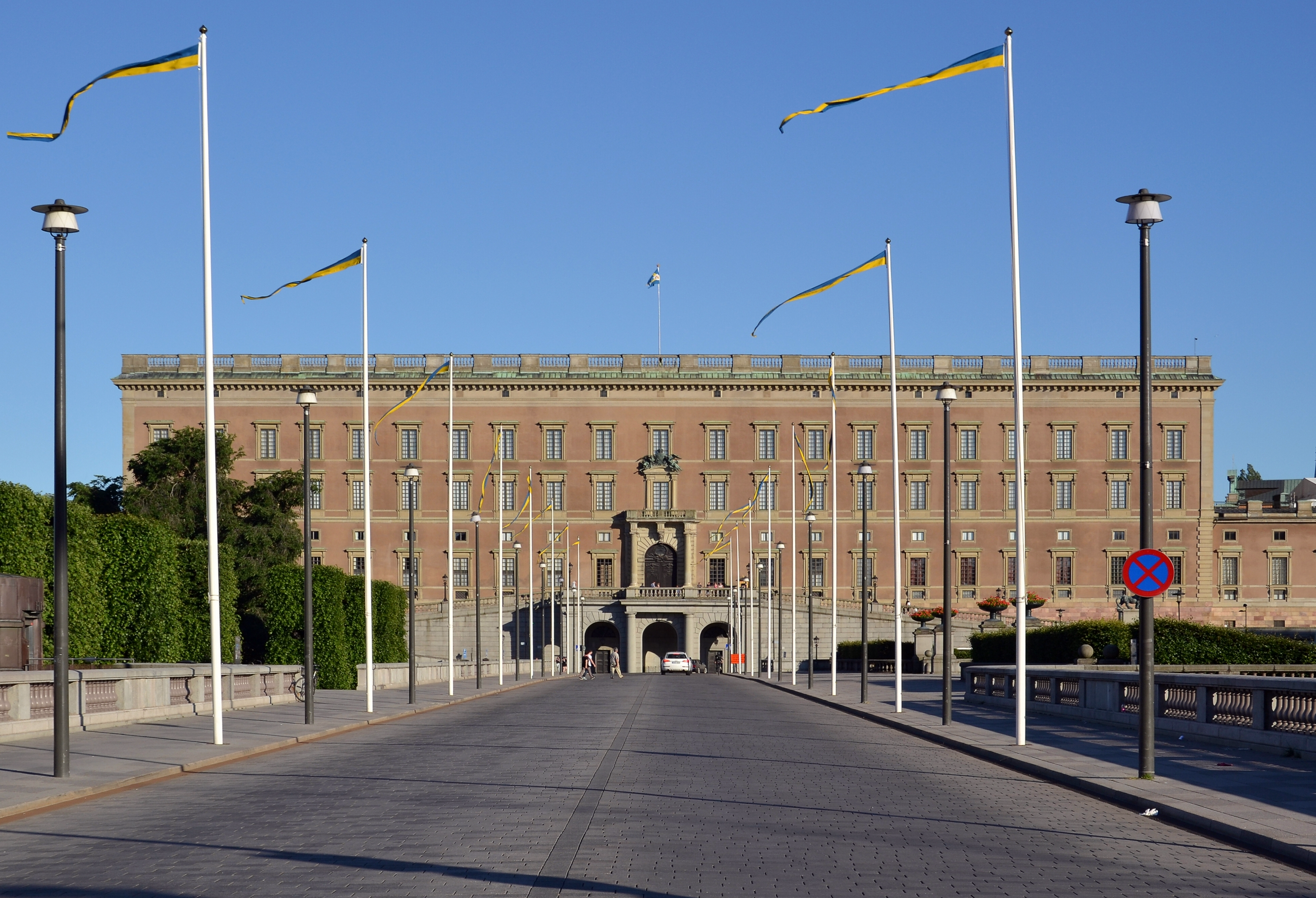
The Stockholm Palace

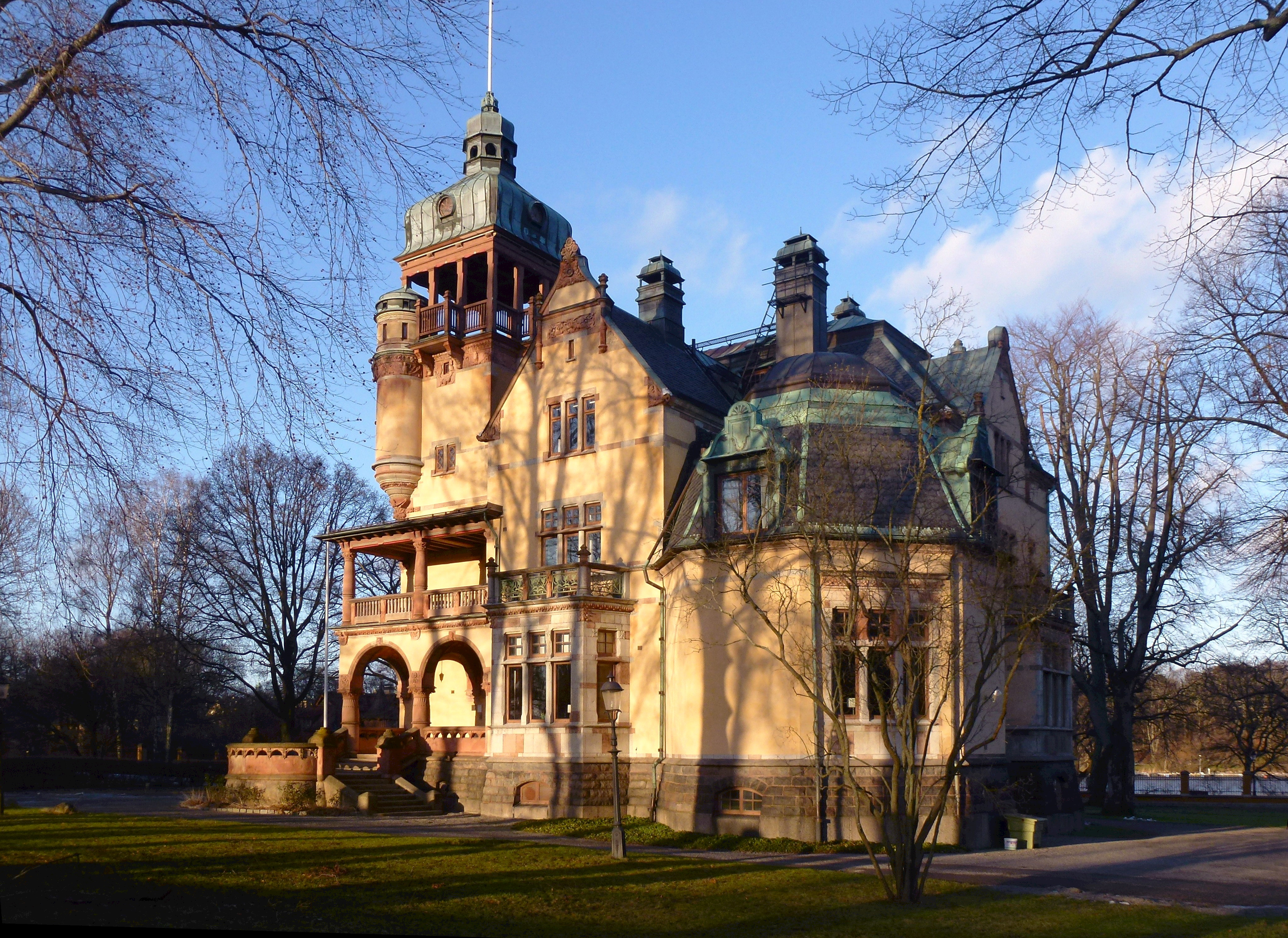
Villa Lusthusporten

- Arvfurstens palats
- Bonde Palace
- Lillienhoff Palace
- Makalös
- Rosendal Palace
- Rosersberg Palace
- Scheffler Palace
- Stockholm Palace
  - Livrustkammaren
  - Regalia of Sweden
  - Royal Chapel
- Tessin Palace
- Van der Nootska Palace
- Villa Lusthusporten
- Wrangel Palace

==== Parks and gardens in Stockholm ====
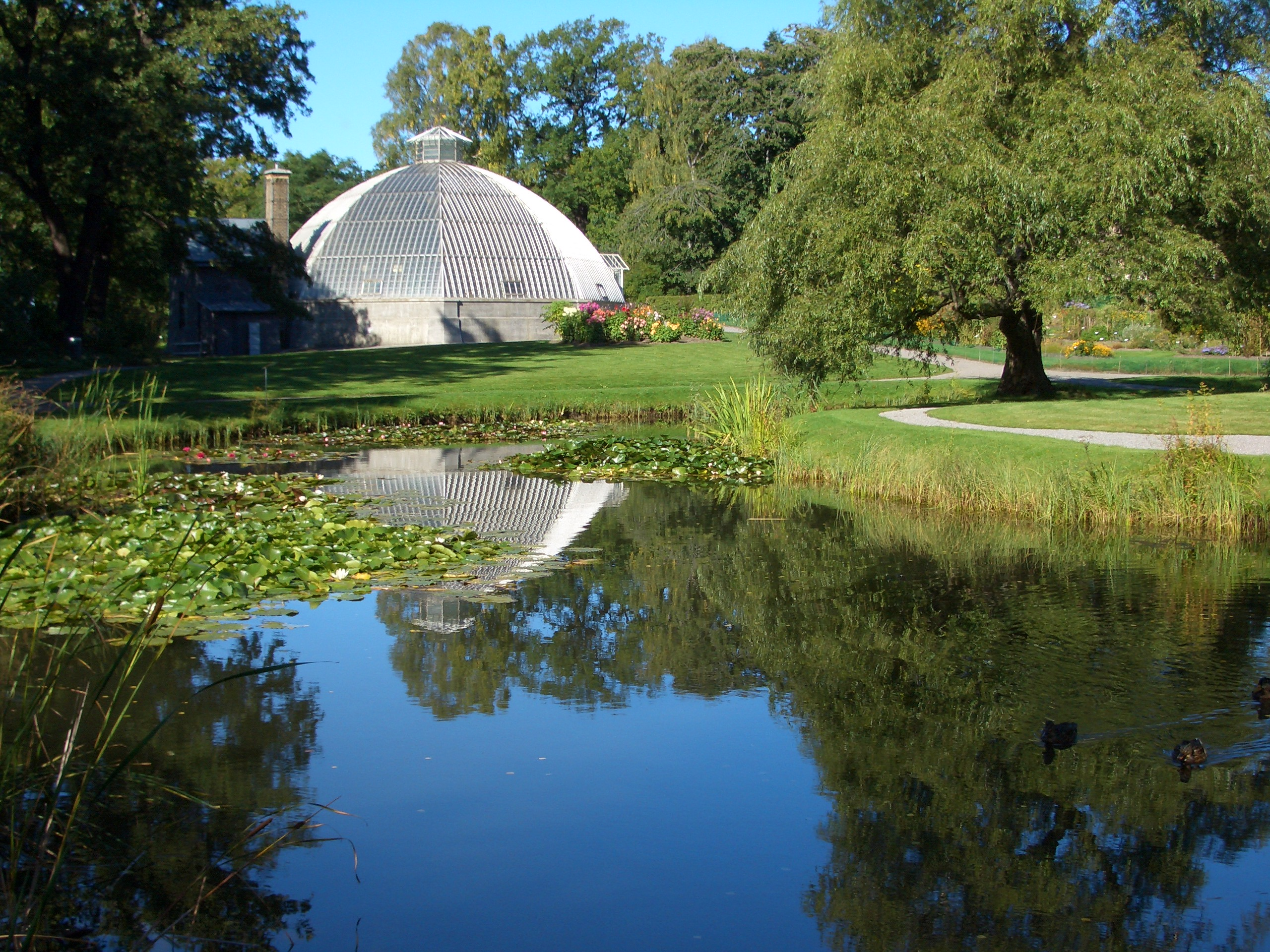
Bergianska trädgården, the Victoria greenhouse

- Bellevue
- Bergianska trädgården
- Hagaparken
- Humlegården
- Kungsträdgården
- Lill-Jansskogen
- Observatorielunden
- Rålambshovsparken
- Rosendals Trädgård
- Royal National City Park
- Tantolunden
- Tegnérlunden
- Vanadislunden
- Vasaparken

==== Public squares in Stockholm ====
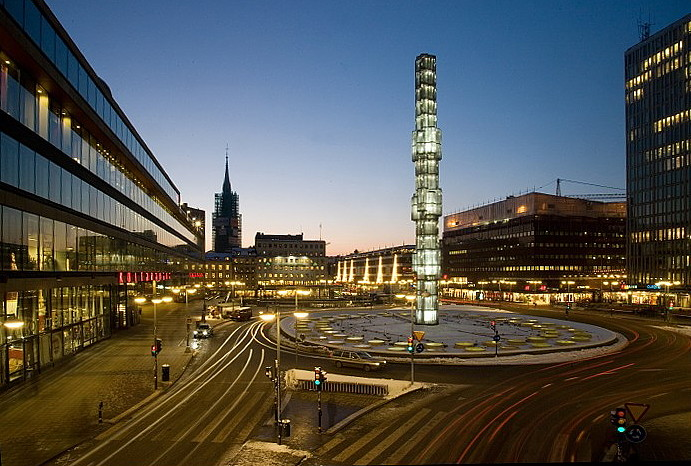
Sergels torg during the blue hour

- Gustav Adolfs torg
- Kornhamnstorg
- Medborgarplatsen
- Norrmalmstorg
- Sergels torg
- Stortorget
- Stureplan

==== Religious buildings in Stockholm ====
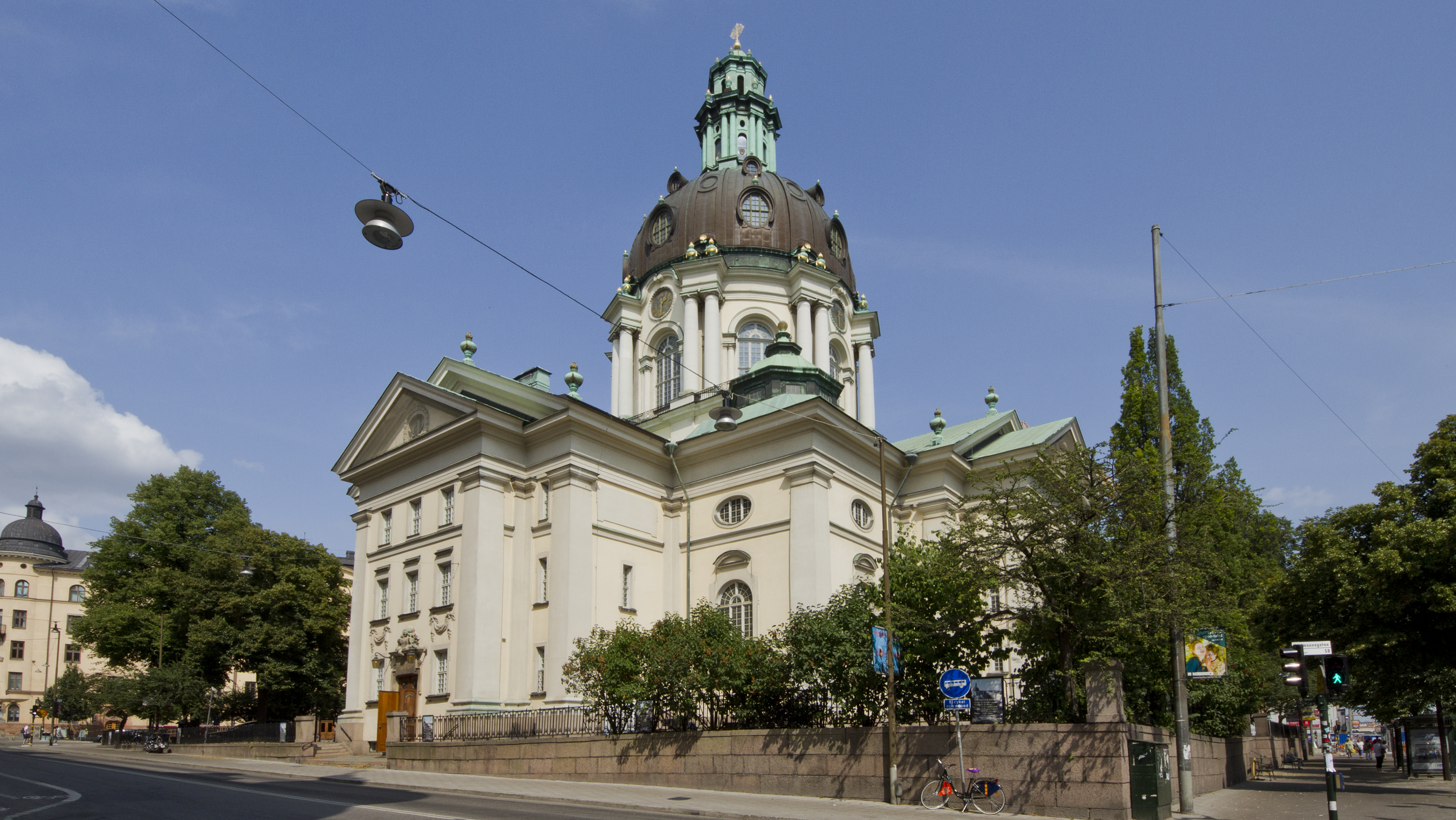
Gustaf Vasa Church

Churches in Stockholm

- German Church
- Gustaf Vasa Church
- Riddarholmen Church
- St. Eric's Cathedral
- St. John's Church
- Stockholm Mosque
- Storkyrkan

==== Secular buildings in Stockholm ====
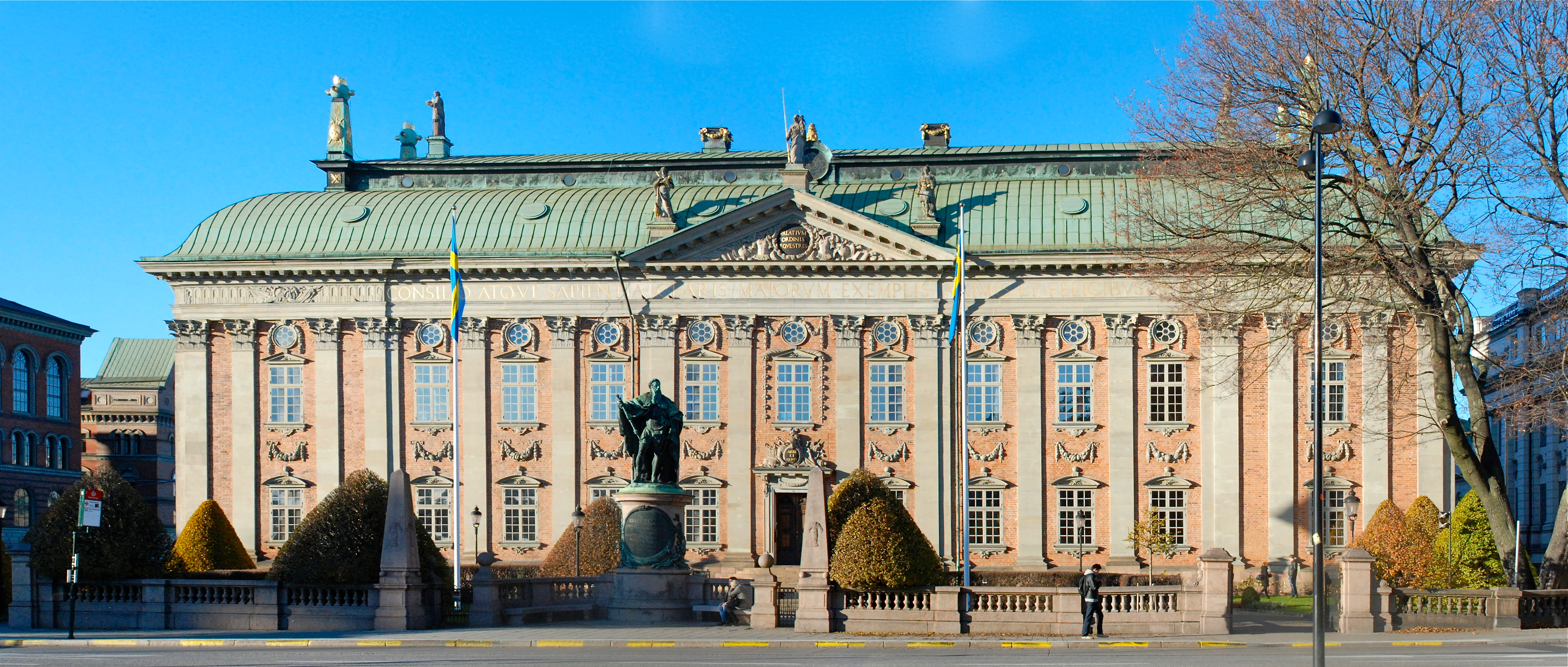
The House of Nobility

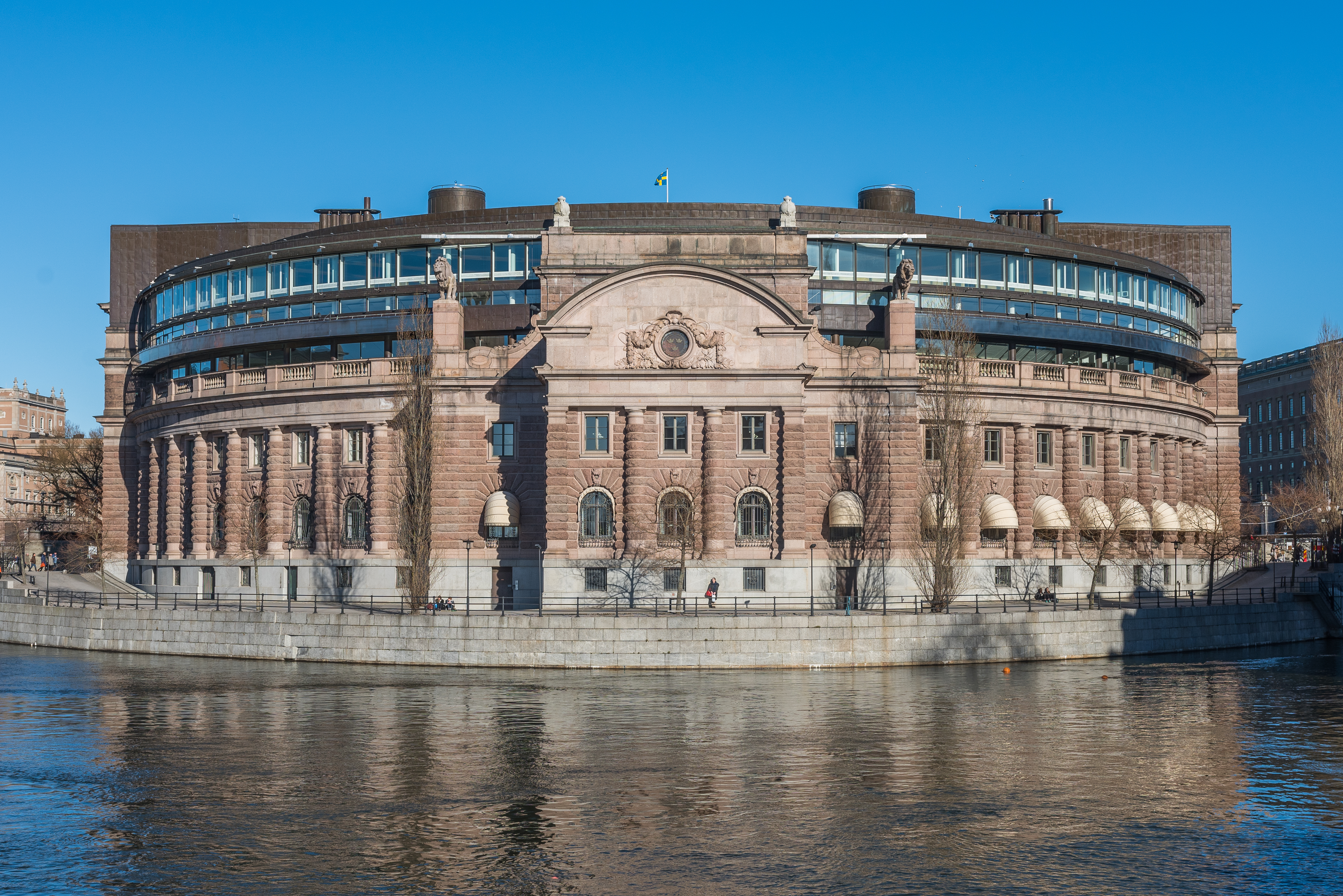
Parliament House

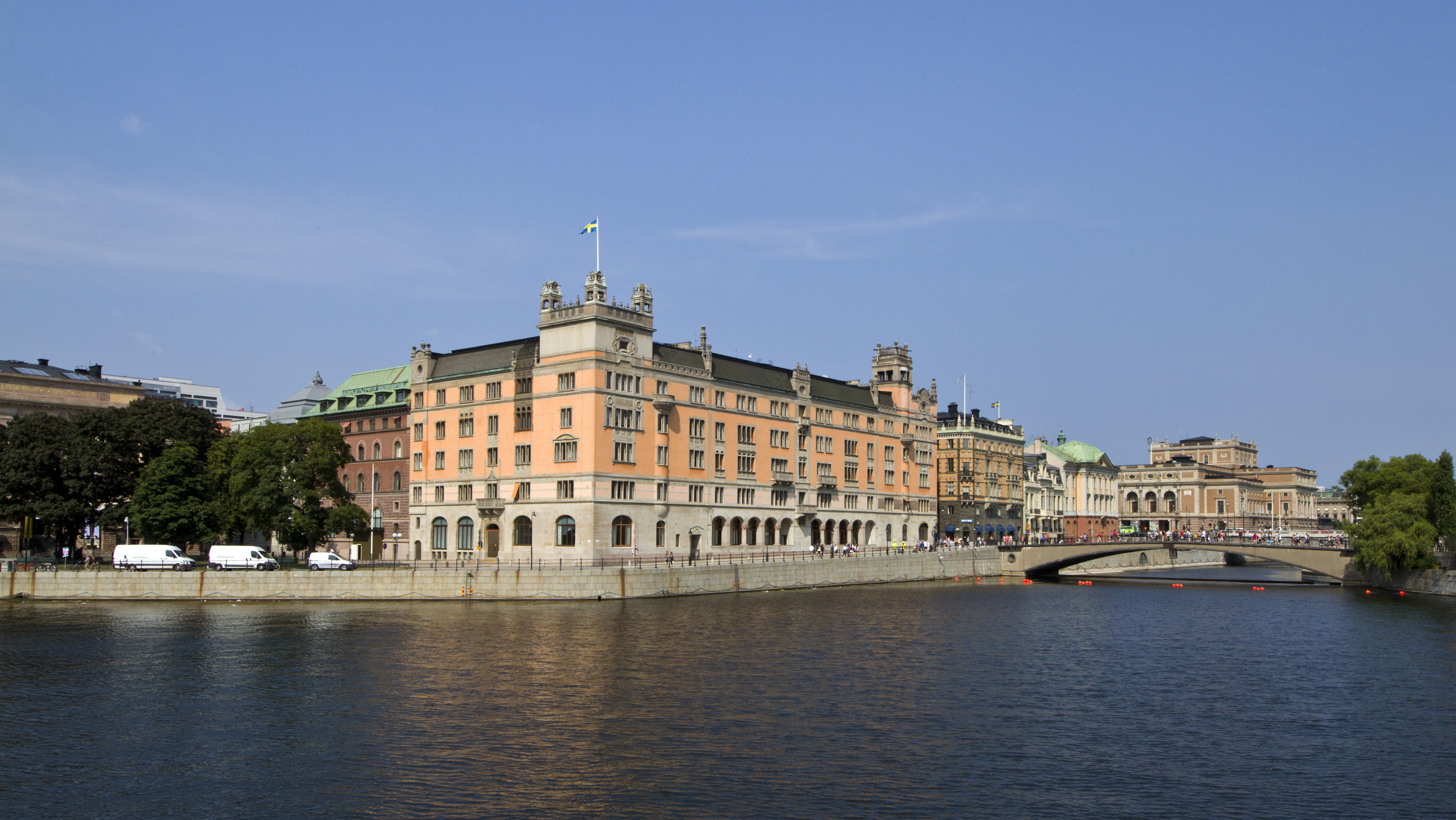
The Rosenbad building

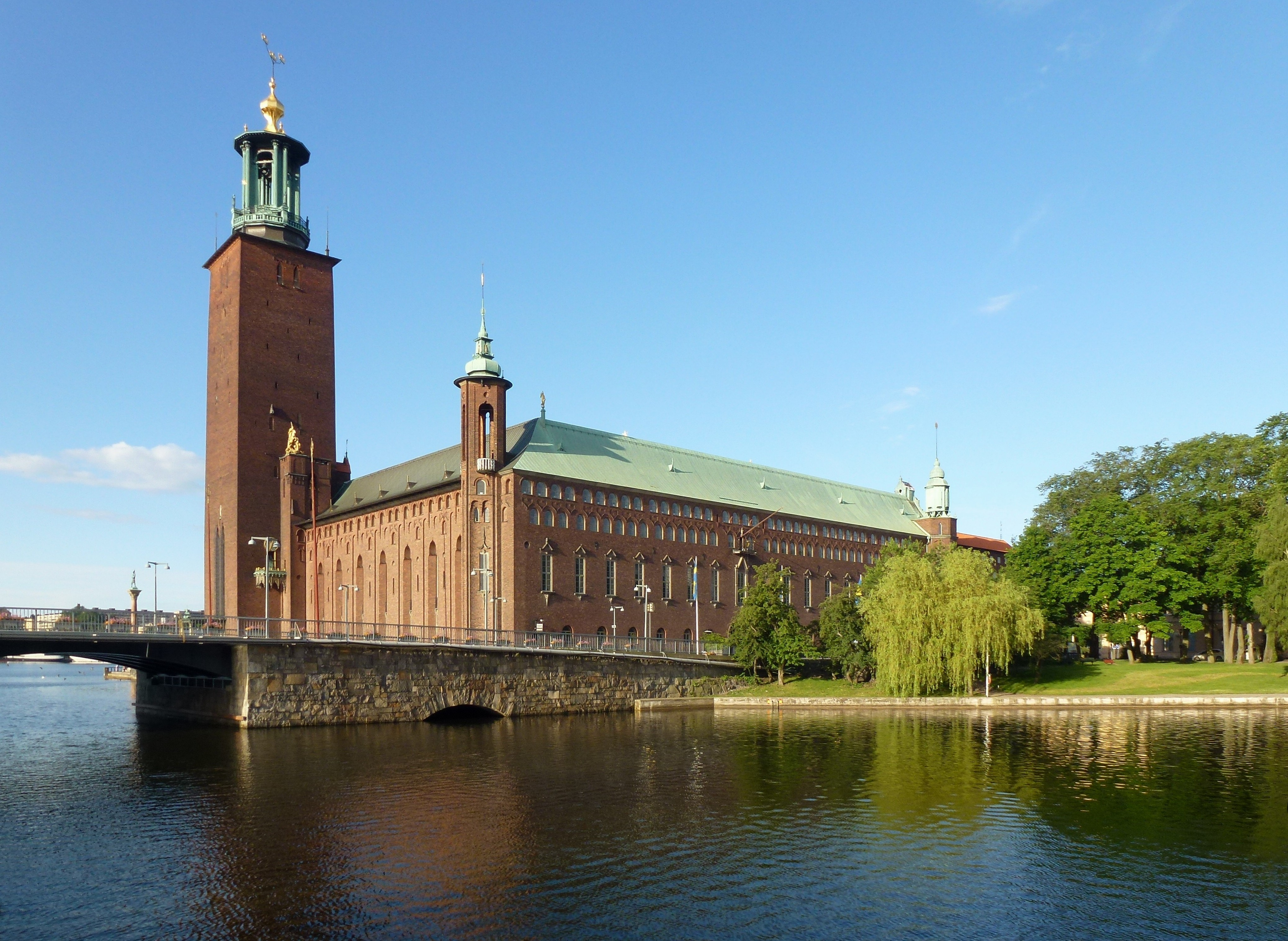
Stockholm City Hall

- Admiralty House
- Birger Jarls torn
- Bofills båge
- Central Post Office Building
- Ericsson Globe
- Gamla Riksarkivet
- Gasklockan
- Hötorget buildings
- House of Nobility
- Kastellet
- Konstnärshuset
- Kungsbrohuset
- Medborgarhuset
- Norstedt Building
- Old Parliament House
- Parliament House
- Rosenbad
- Royal Stables
- Sager House
- Södra Bankohuset
- Stockholm City Hall
  - Blue Hall
  - Golden Hall
- Stockholm Court House
- Stockholm Observatory
- Stockholm Public Library
- Stockholm Waterfront

==== Streets in Stockholm ====
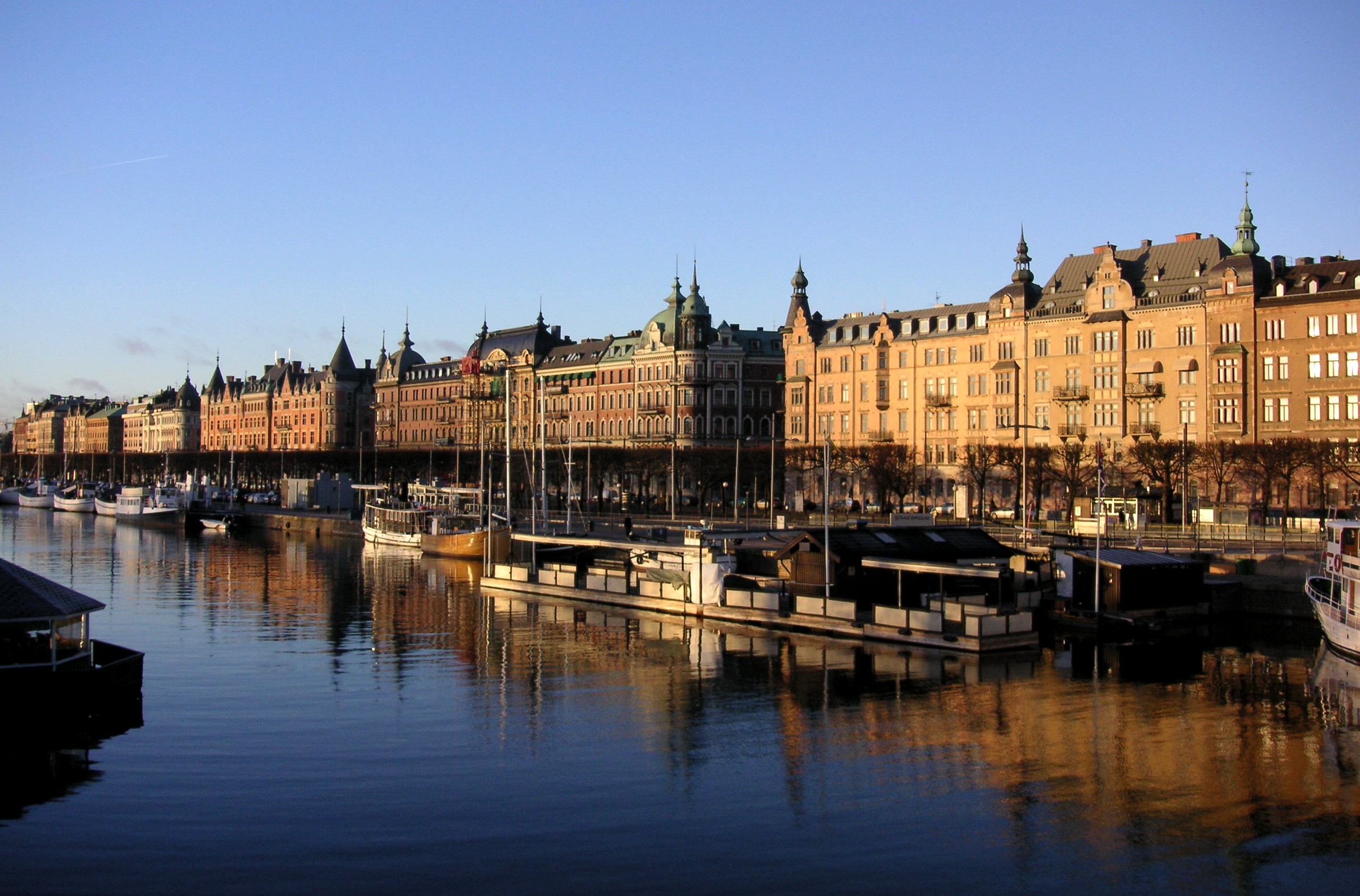
The Strandvägen boulevard

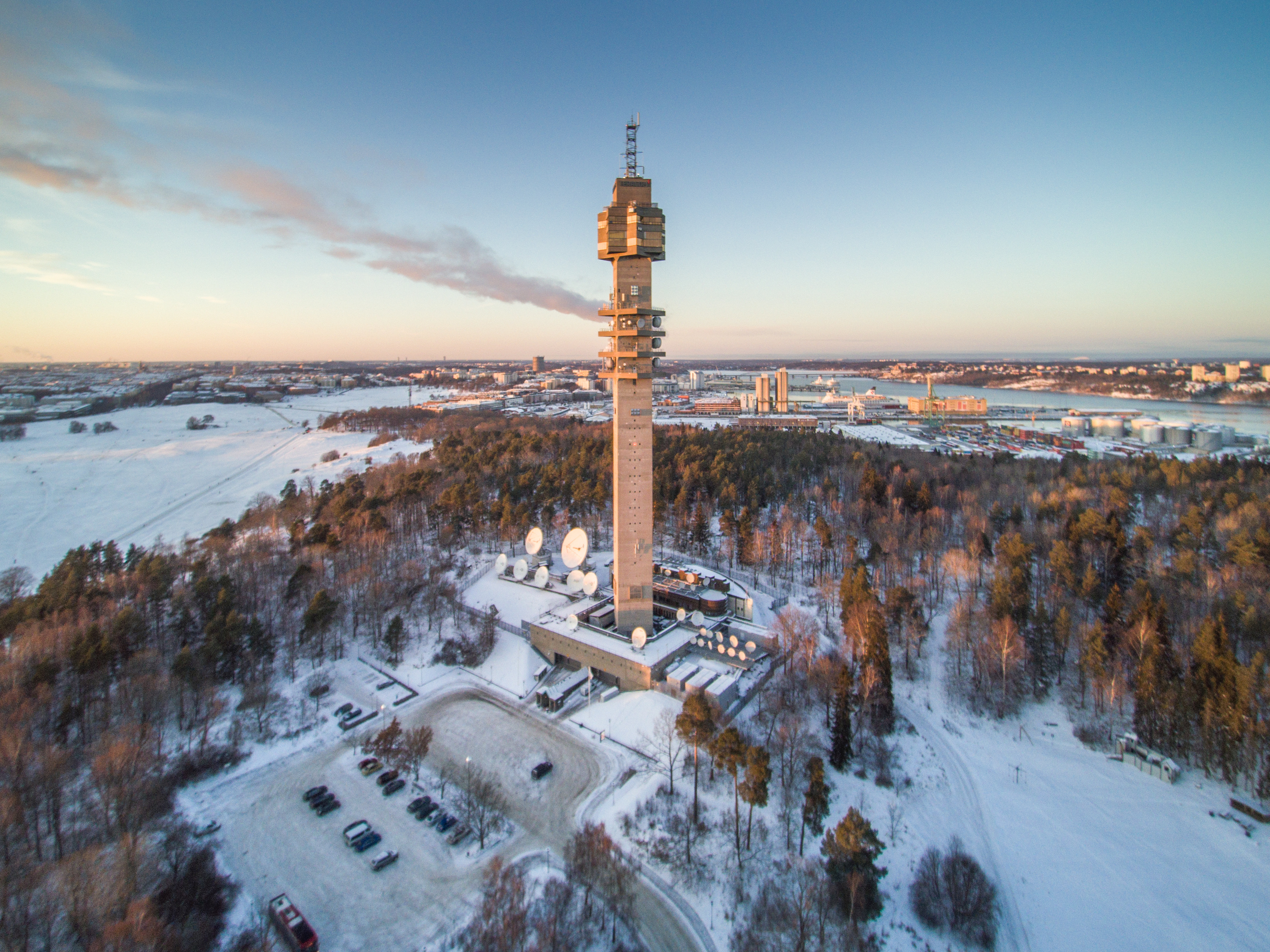
The Kaknäs Tower

Streets and squares in Gamla stan

- Bankkajen
- Drottninggatan
- Götgatan
- Kungsgatan
- Riksgatan
- Skeppsbron
- Slottsbacken
- Strandvägen
- Sveavägen
- Vasagatan

==== Theatres in Stockholm ====
- Oscarsteatern
- Royal Dramatic Theatre
- Södra Teatern
- Stockholm City Theatre

==== Towers in Stockholm ====
- Kaknästornet

=== Demographics of Stockholm ===
Demographics of Stockholm

== Government and politics of Stockholm ==
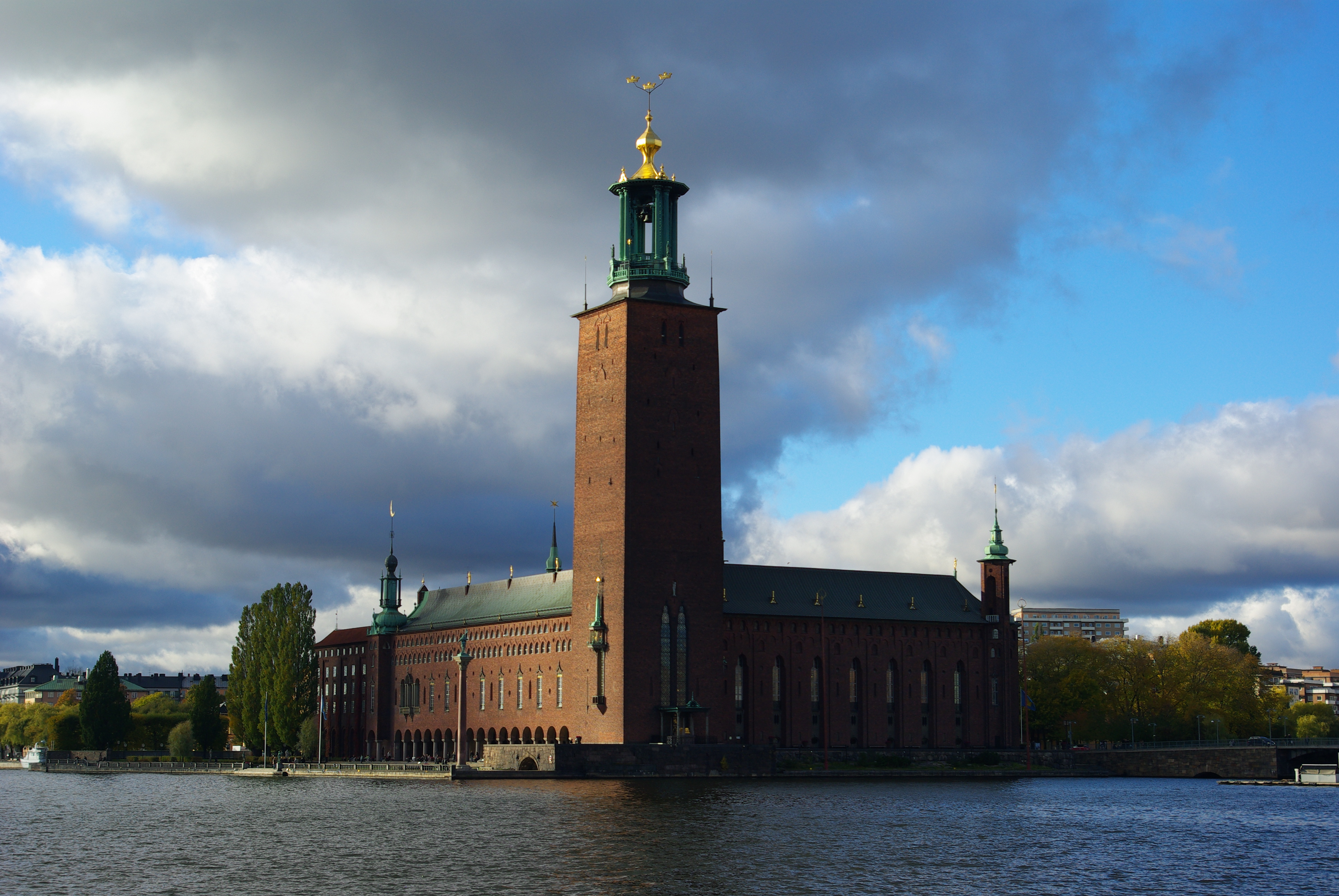
Stockholm City Hall, the building of the Municipal Council

Government of Stockholm

- Stockholm Municipality
- Mayor of Stockholm
- International relations of Stockholm
  - Twin towns and sister cities of Stockholm

=== Law and order in Stockholm ===
- Law enforcement in Stockholm
  - Stockholm Police Force

=== Military in Stockholm ===
- Royal Guards

== History of Stockholm ==
History of Stockholm

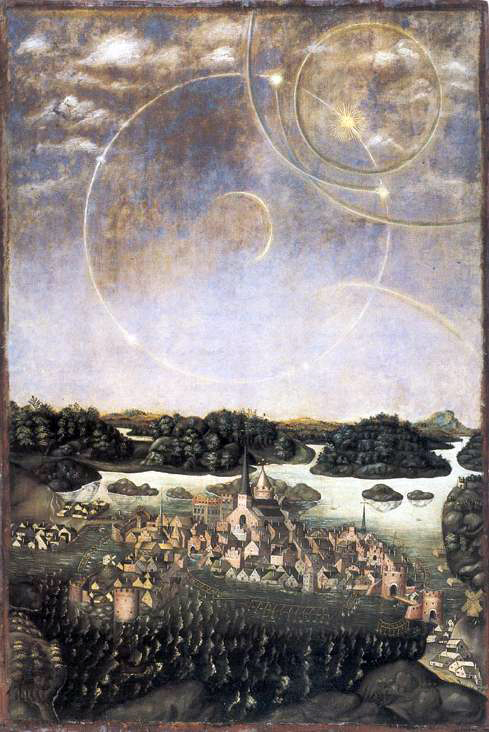
Vädersolstavlan ("The Sun Dog Painting"), the oldest image depicting Stockholm

=== History of Stockholm, by period or event ===
Timeline of Stockholm history

- Prehistory and origin of Stockholm
- Stockholm during the Middle Ages (1250–1523)
  - Stockholm Bloodbath (1520)
- Stockholm during the early Vasa era (1523–1611)
- Stockholm during the Swedish Empire (1611–1718)
  - Thirty Years' War (1618–1648)
- Stockholm during the Age of Liberty (1718–1772)
- Stockholm during the Gustavian era (1772–1809)
- Early industrial era (1809–1850)
- Late industrial era (1850–1910)
- Stockholm during the 20th century

=== History of Stockholm, by subject ===
- Historical fires of Stockholm

== Culture of Stockholm ==
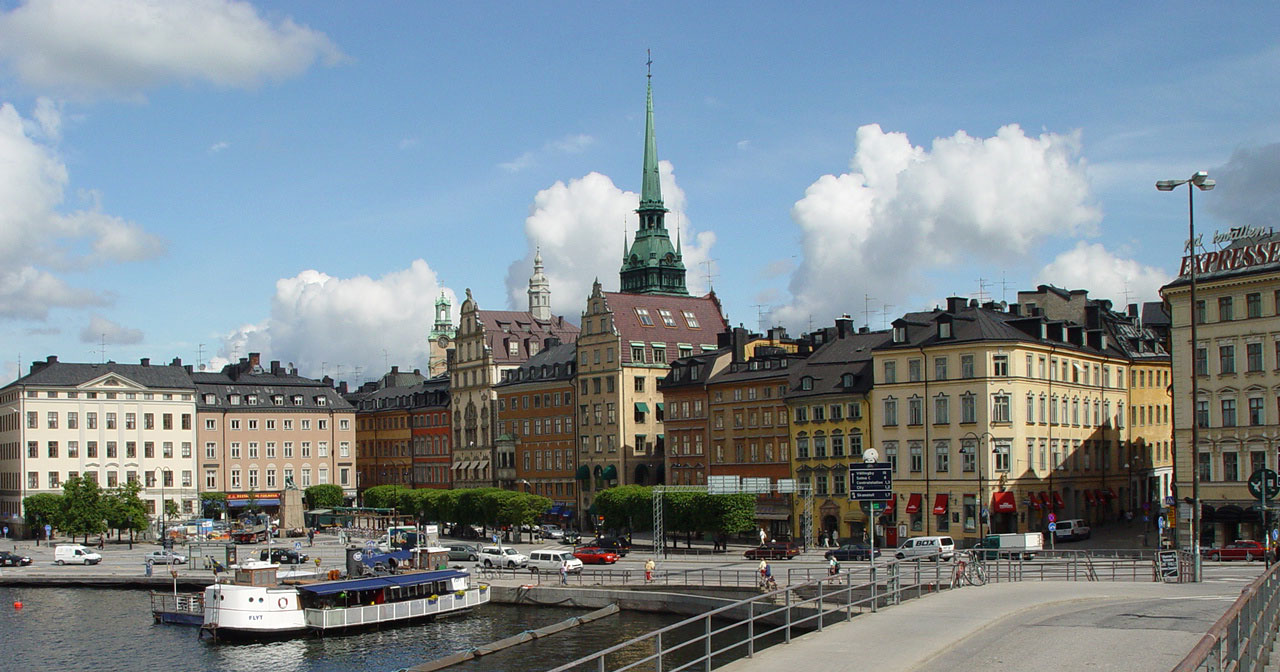
Architecture of Stockholm, view of the Old Town

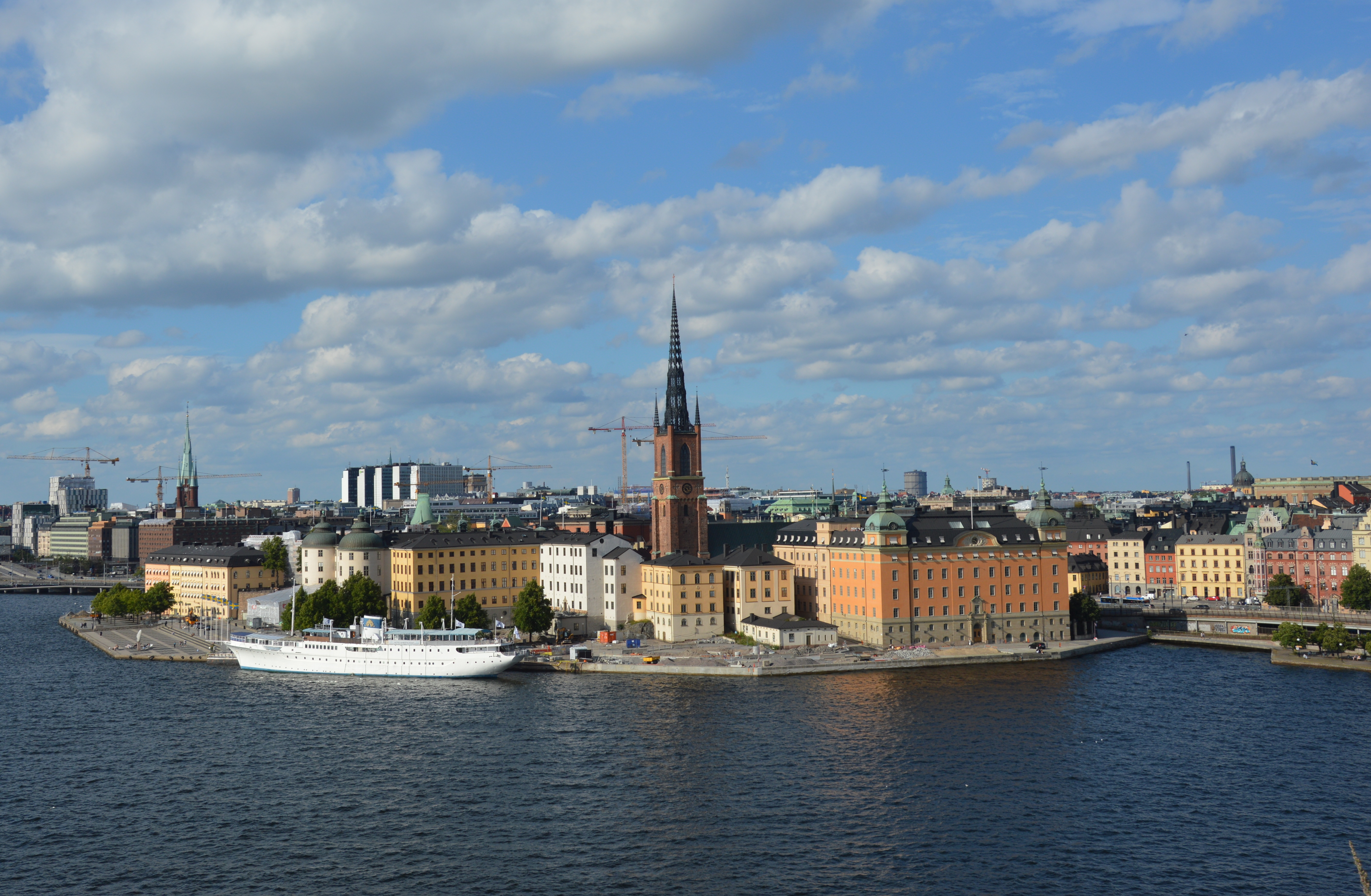
Riddarholmen

Culture of Stockholm

=== Arts in Stockholm ===
==== Architecture of Stockholm ====
Architecture in Stockholm

- Buildings in Stockholm
  - Tallest buildings in Stockholm

==== Cinema of Stockholm ====
- Movie theaters in Stockholm
- Stockholm International Film Festival

==== Literature of Stockholm ====
Literature in Stockholm

==== Music of Stockholm ====
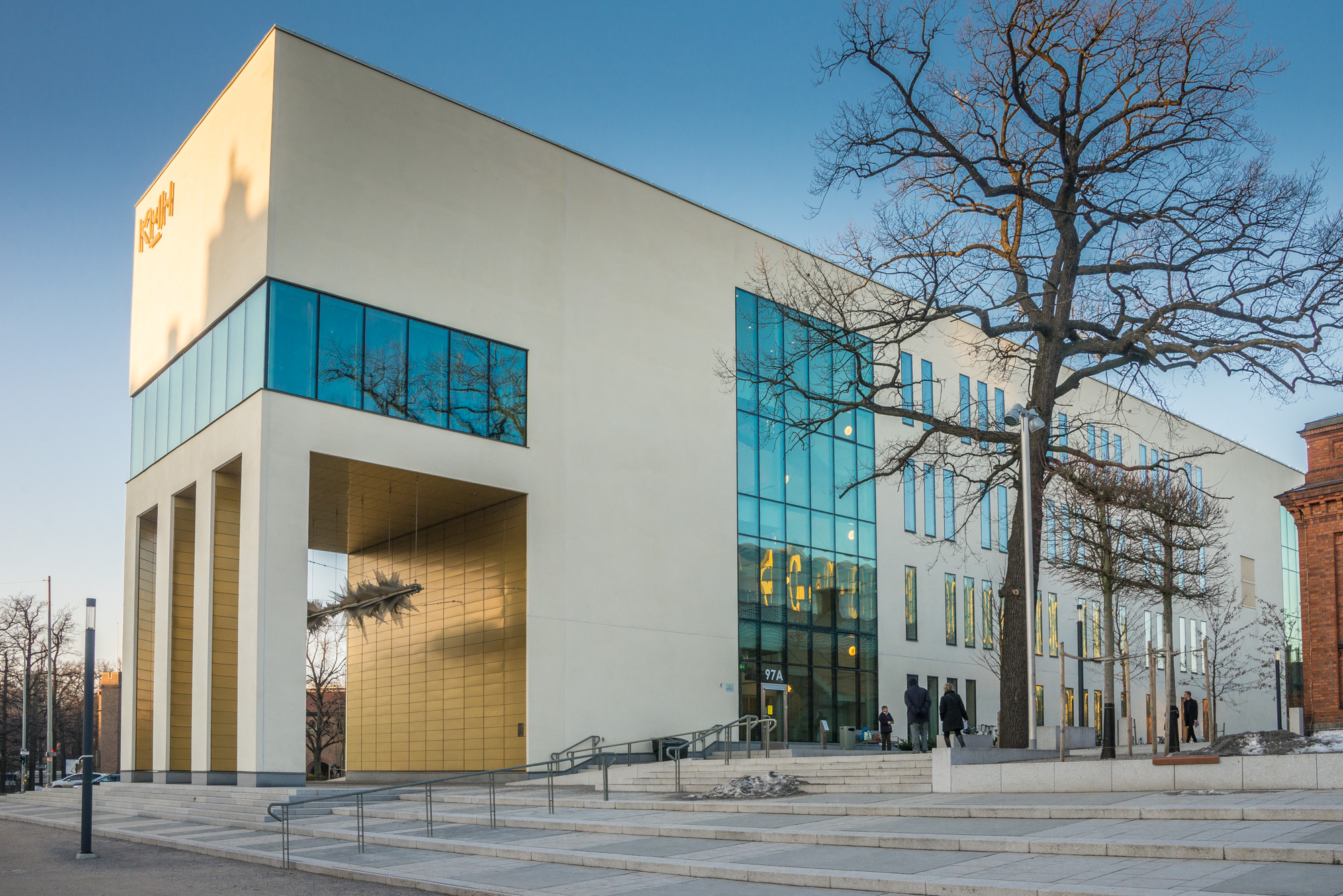
The Royal College of Music

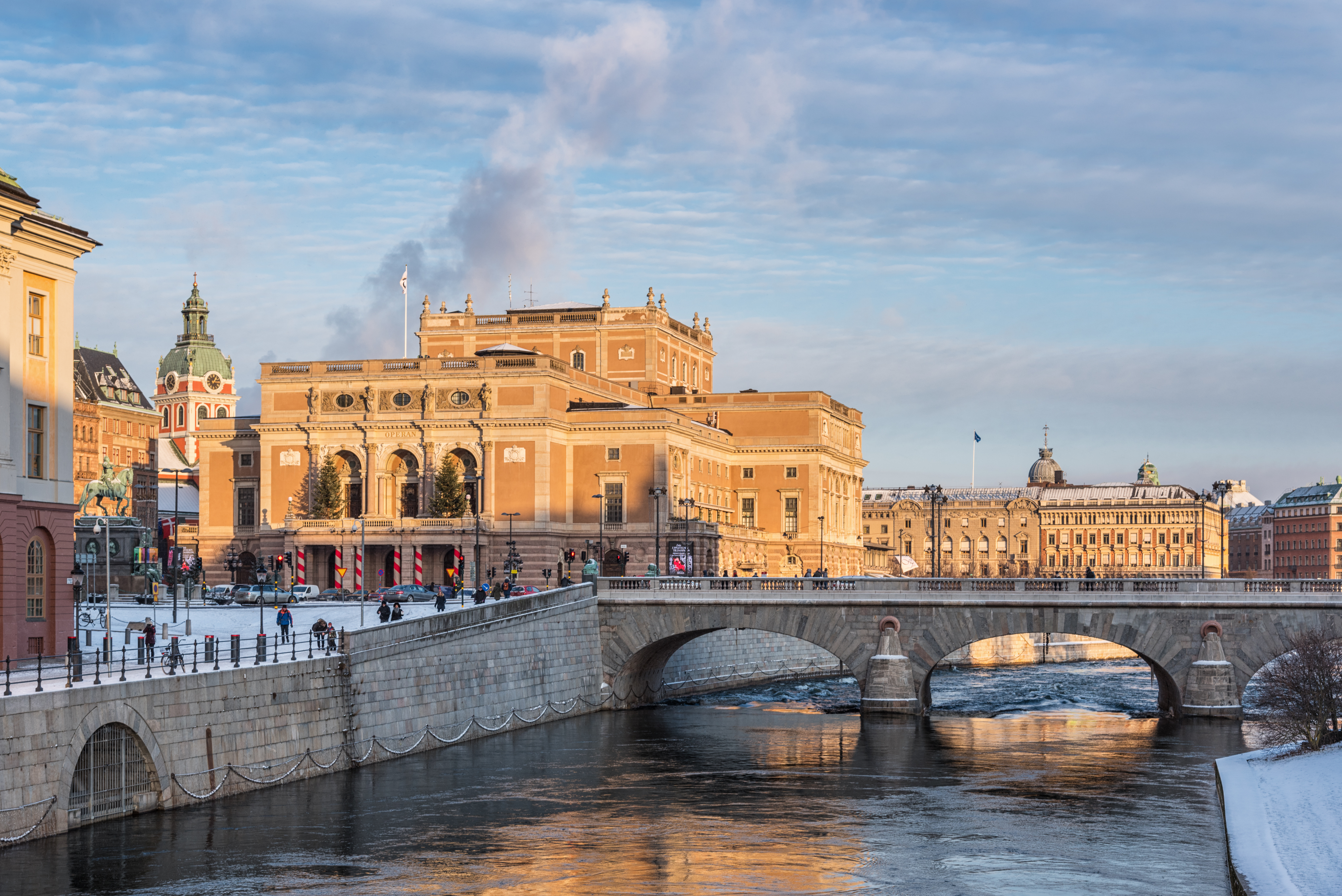
Royal Swedish Opera

Music of Stockholm

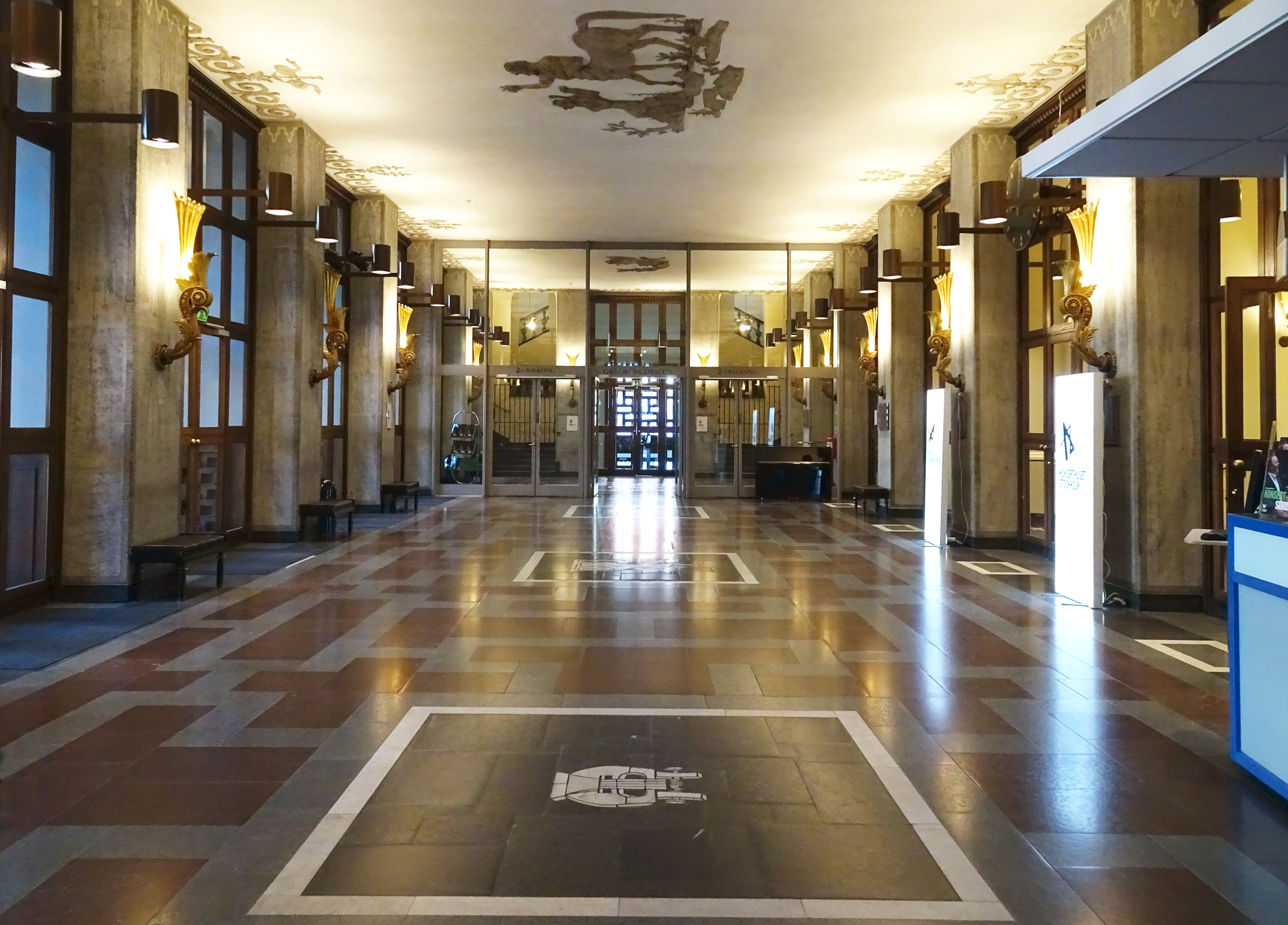
Foyer of the Stockholm Concert Hall

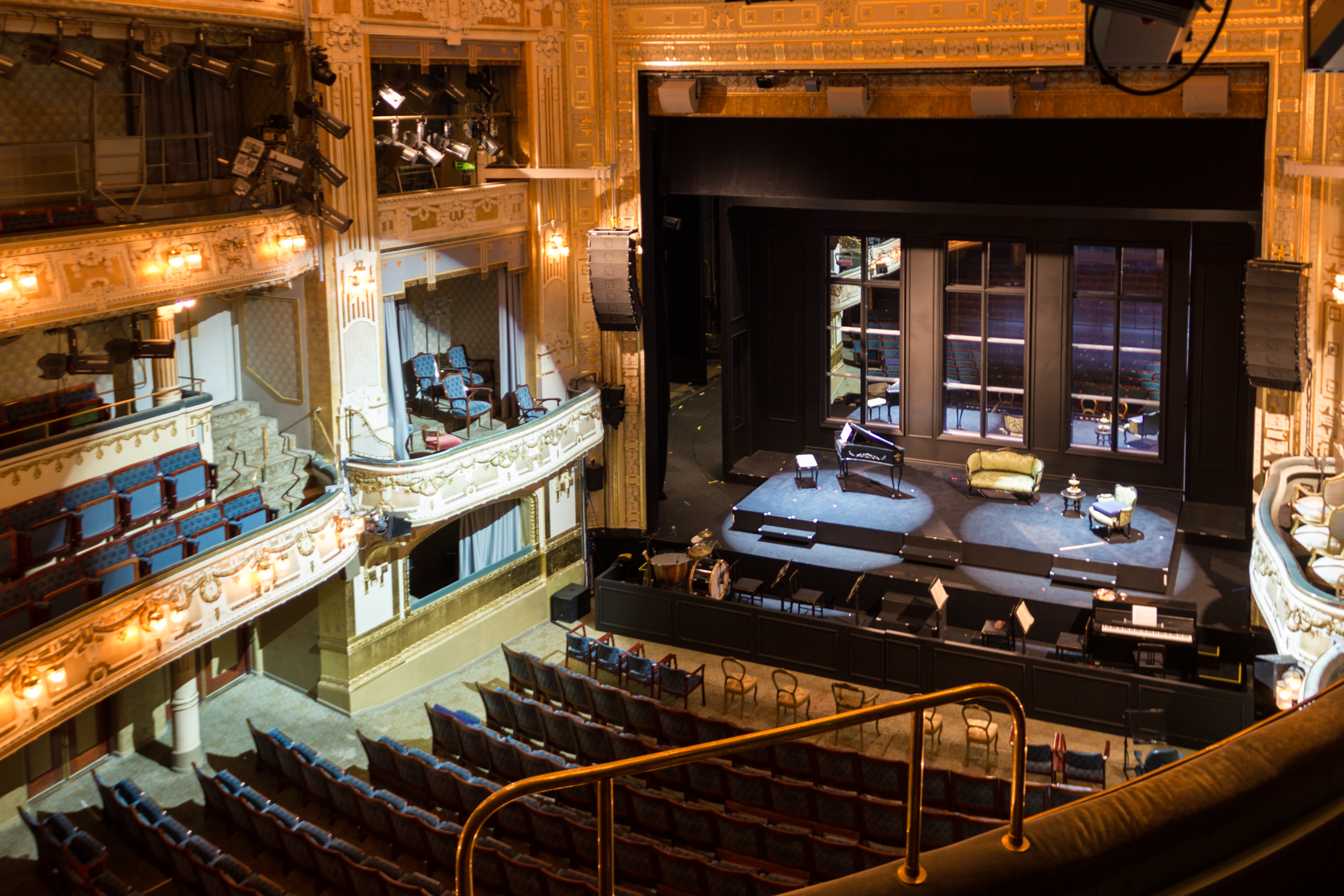
Main stage of the Royal Dramatic Theatre

- Music festivals and competitions in Stockholm
  - Sound of Stockholm
  - Stockholm Jazz Festival
- Music schools in Stockholm
  - Royal College of Music
  - Royal Swedish Academy of Music
  - Stockholm University College of Music Education
  - University College of Opera
- Music venues in Stockholm
  - Berwaldhallen
  - Folkoperan
  - Royal Swedish Opera
  - Stockholm Concert Hall
- Musical ensembles in Stockholm
  - Kungliga Hovkapellet
  - Royal Stockholm Philharmonic Orchestra
  - Stockholm Youth Symphony Orchestra
  - Swedish Radio Choir
  - Swedish Radio Symphony Orchestra
- Musicians from Stockholm
  - Hugo Alfvén
  - Franz Berwald
  - Wilhelm Stenhammar
- Songs about Stockholm

==== Theatre of Stockholm ====
Theatres in Stockholm

- Göta Lejon
- Maximteatern
- Orion Theatre
- Royal Dramatic Theatre
- Teater Galeasen

==== Visual arts of Stockholm ====
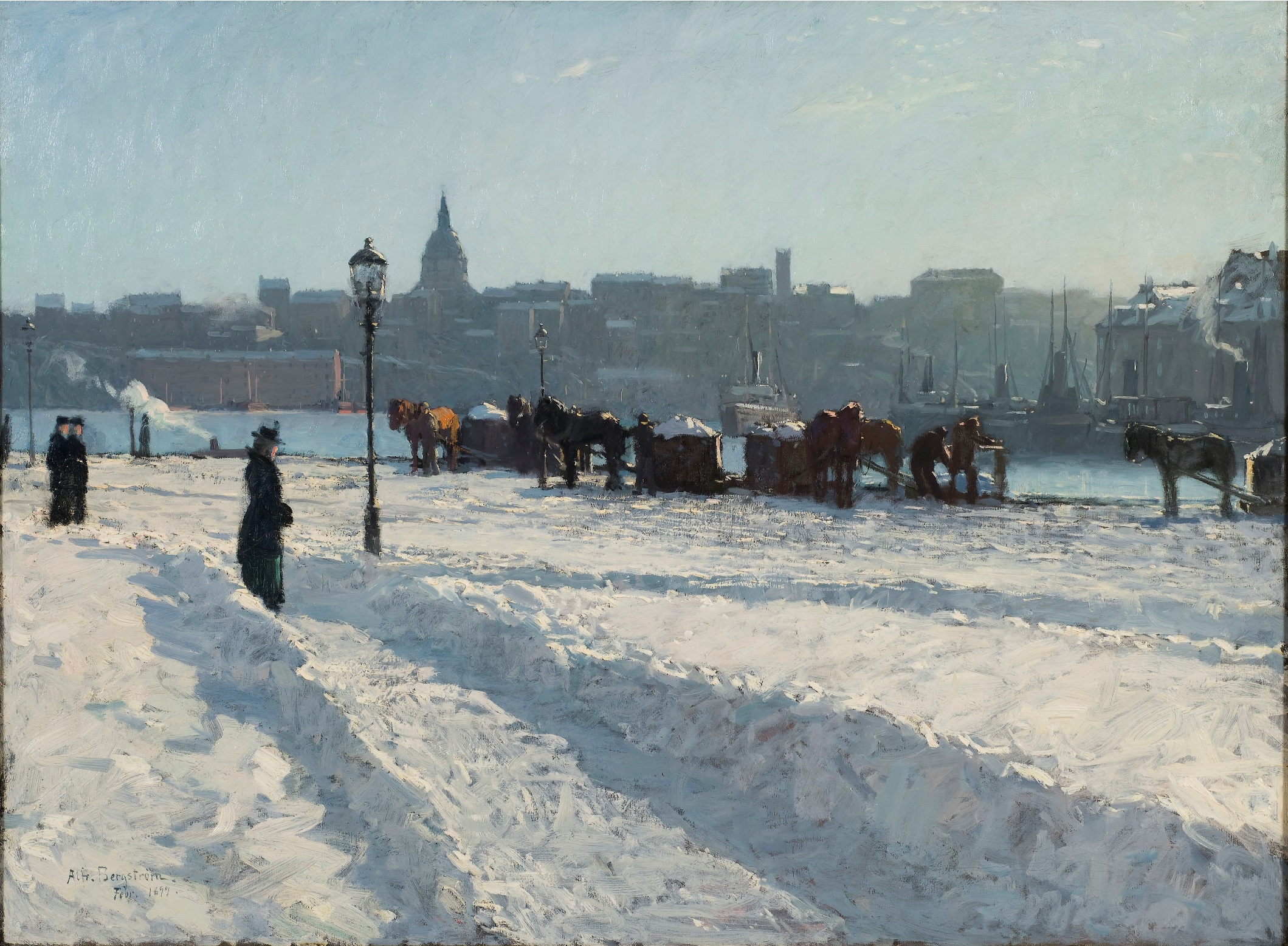
Stockholm in art: Winter scene from Stockholm by Alfred Bergström

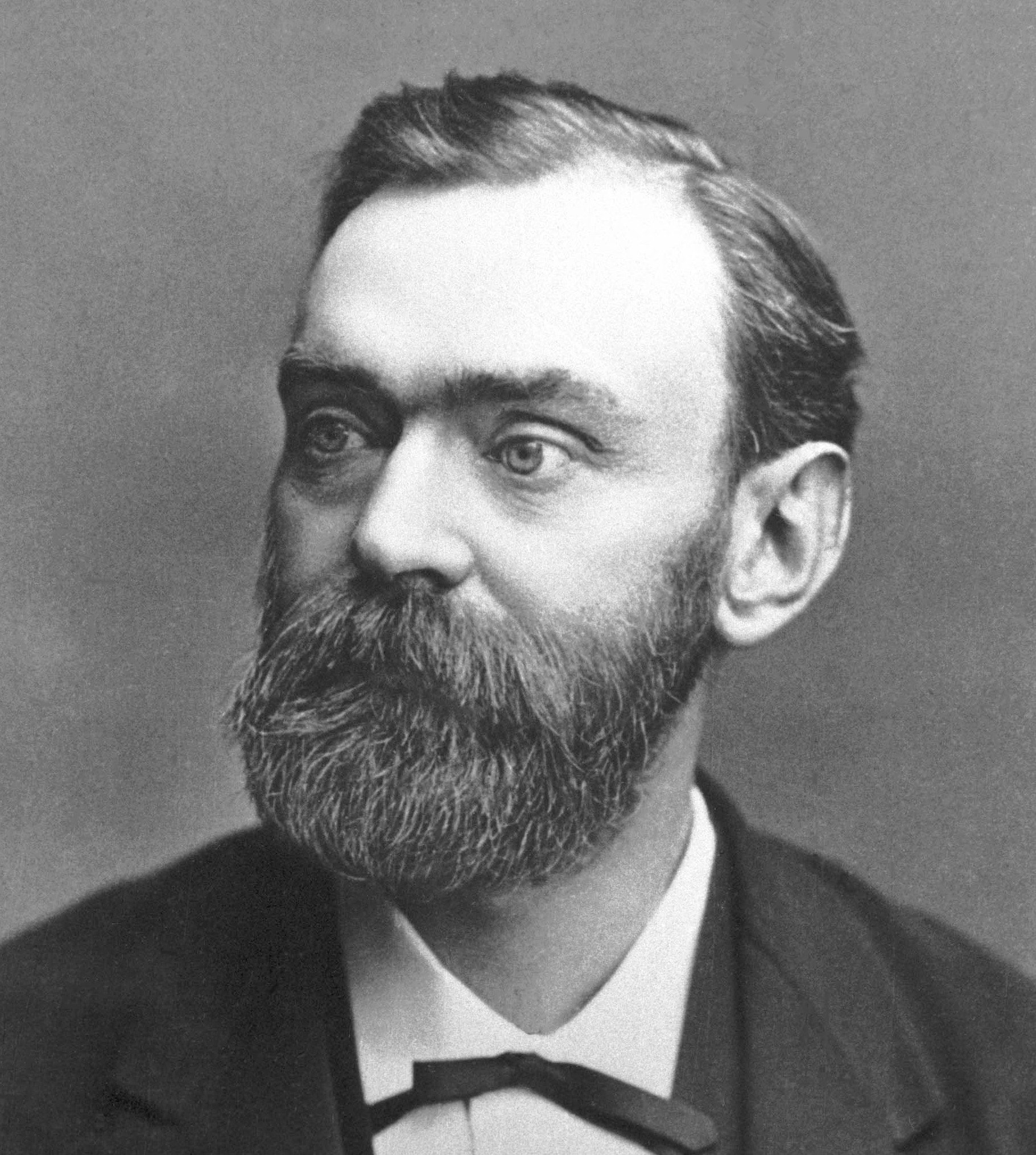
Alfred Nobel, Swedish chemist, engineer, inventor, born in Stockholm in 1833

Art in Stockholm

- Stockholm in art / Paintings of Stockholm
- Public art in Stockholm
  - Efter badet
  - The Four Elements

Cuisine of Stockholm

- Söder tea

Events in Stockholm

- Nobel Banquet
- Stockholm Japan Expo

Festivals in Stockholm

- Stockholm Water Festival

Languages of Stockholm

- Swedish language
- Stockholm dialects

Media in Stockholm

- Newspapers in Stockholm
  - Expressen
  - Svenska Dagbladet
- Radio and television in Stockholm
  - Sveriges Radio
  - Sveriges Television

People from Stockholm

- Alfred Nobel

=== Religion in Stockholm ===
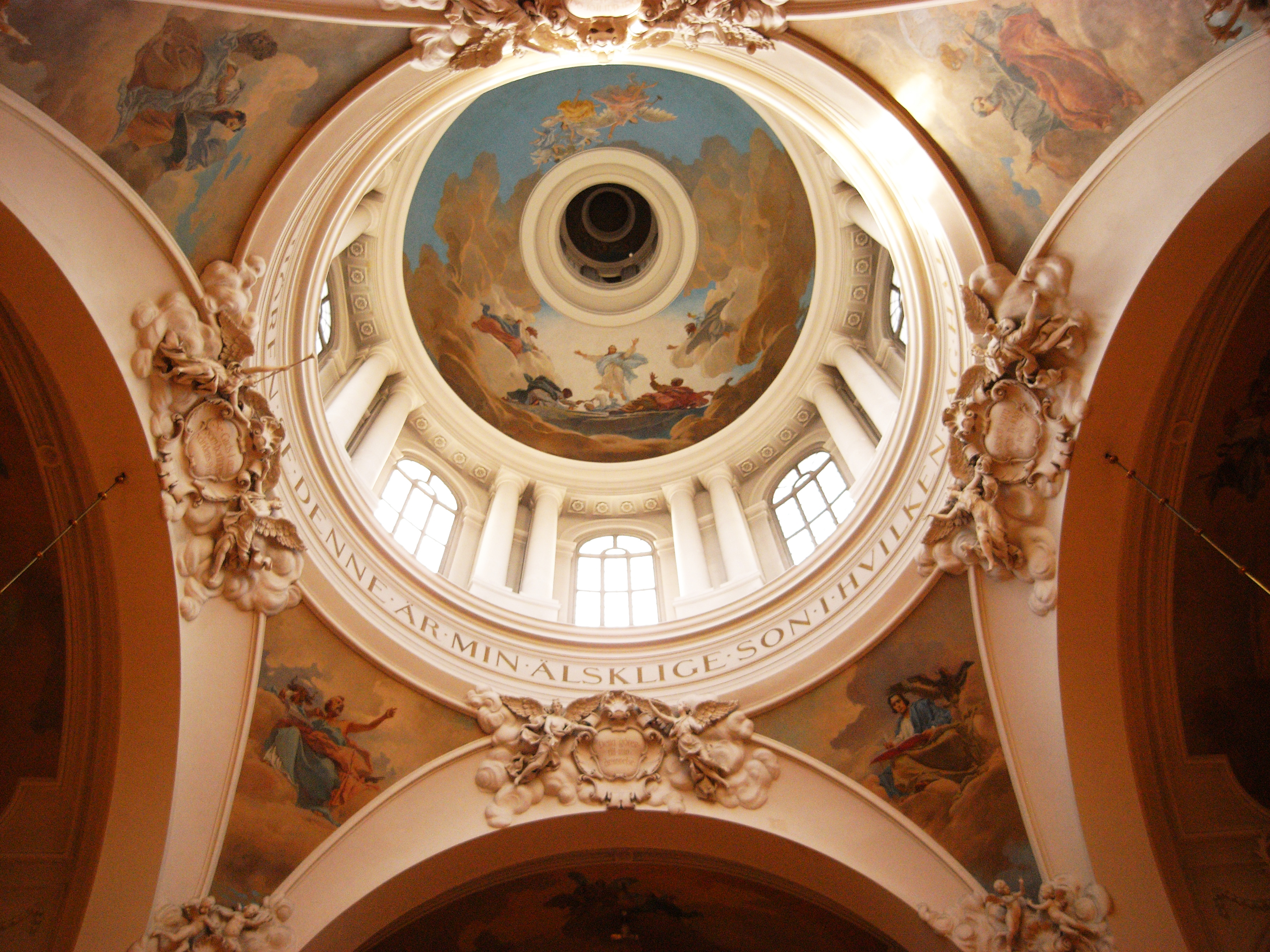
Dome and wall paintings in Gustaf Vasa Church

Religion in Stockholm

- Catholicism in Stockholm
  - Roman Catholic Diocese of Stockholm
    - St. Eric's Cathedral
- Protestantism in Stockholm
  - Church of Sweden
    - Diocese of Stockholm (Church of Sweden)
      - Gustaf Vasa Church
- Islam in Stockholm
  - Stockholm Mosque

=== Sports in Stockholm ===
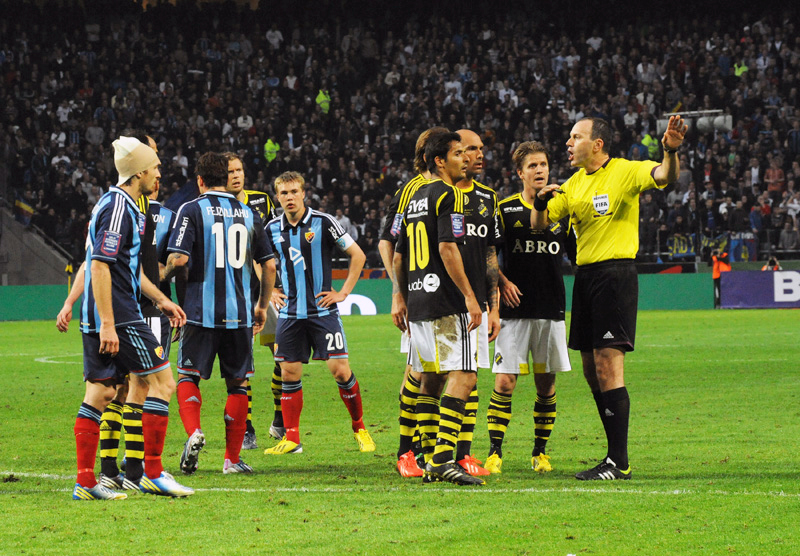
Djurgårdens IF (left) take on AIK (right) at the Tvillingderbyt in 2013

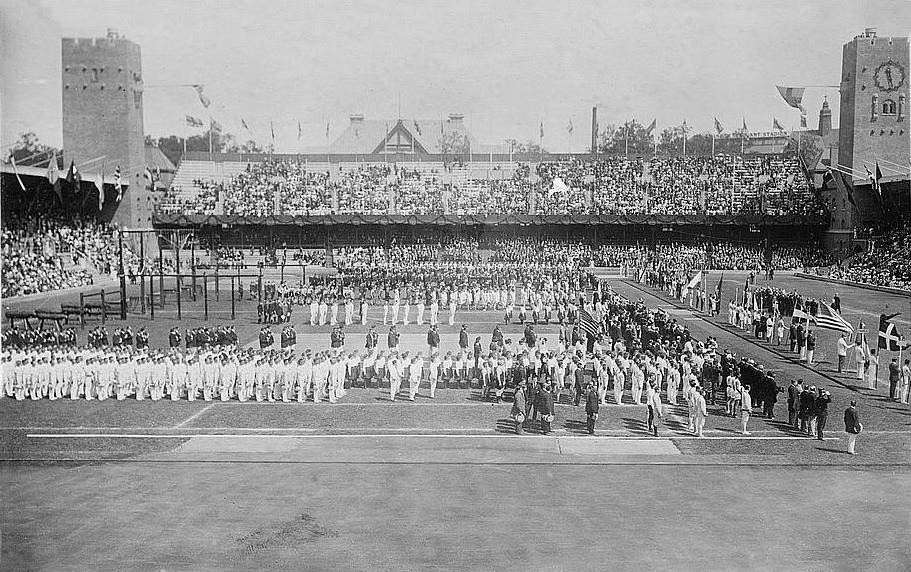
Opening ceremony of the 1912 Summer Olympics

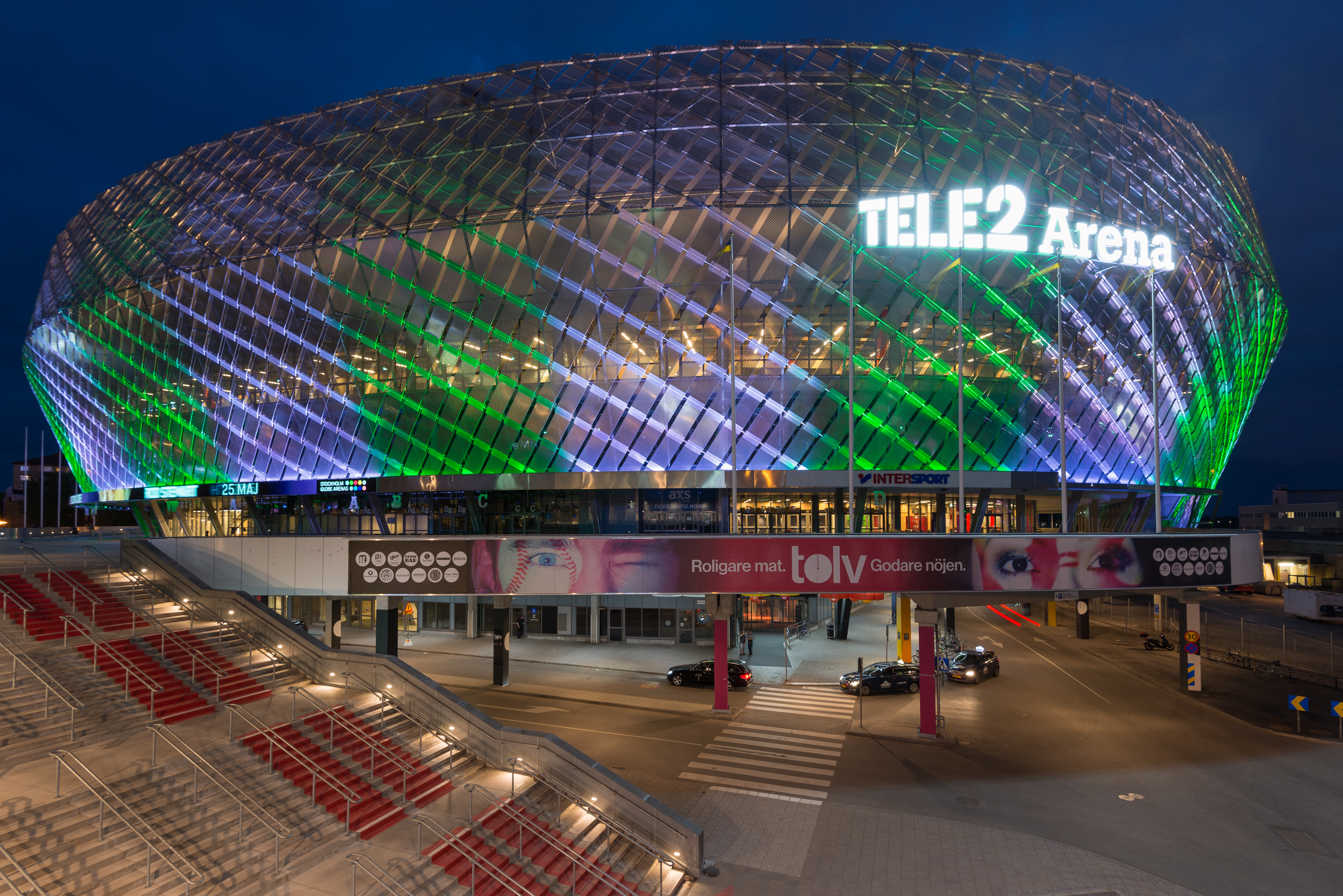
3Arena

Sport in Stockholm

- Basketball in Stockholm
  - Solna Vikings
- Football in Stockholm
  - Association football in Stockholm
    - Stockholm derby
      - AIK Fotboll
      - Djurgårdens IF Fotboll
- Ice hockey in Stockholm
  - Sweden men's national ice hockey team
- Sports competitions in Stockholm
  - 1912 Summer Olympics
  - Stockholm Marathon
  - Stockholm Open
  - Sweden Hockey Games
- Sports venues in Stockholm
  - Eriksdalsbadet
  - Strawberry Arena
  - Hovet
  - Kungliga tennishallen
  - Kungsängen Golf Club
  - Solvalla
  - Stockholm Olympic Stadium
  - 3Arena
    - Events at 3Arena

== Economy and infrastructure of Stockholm ==
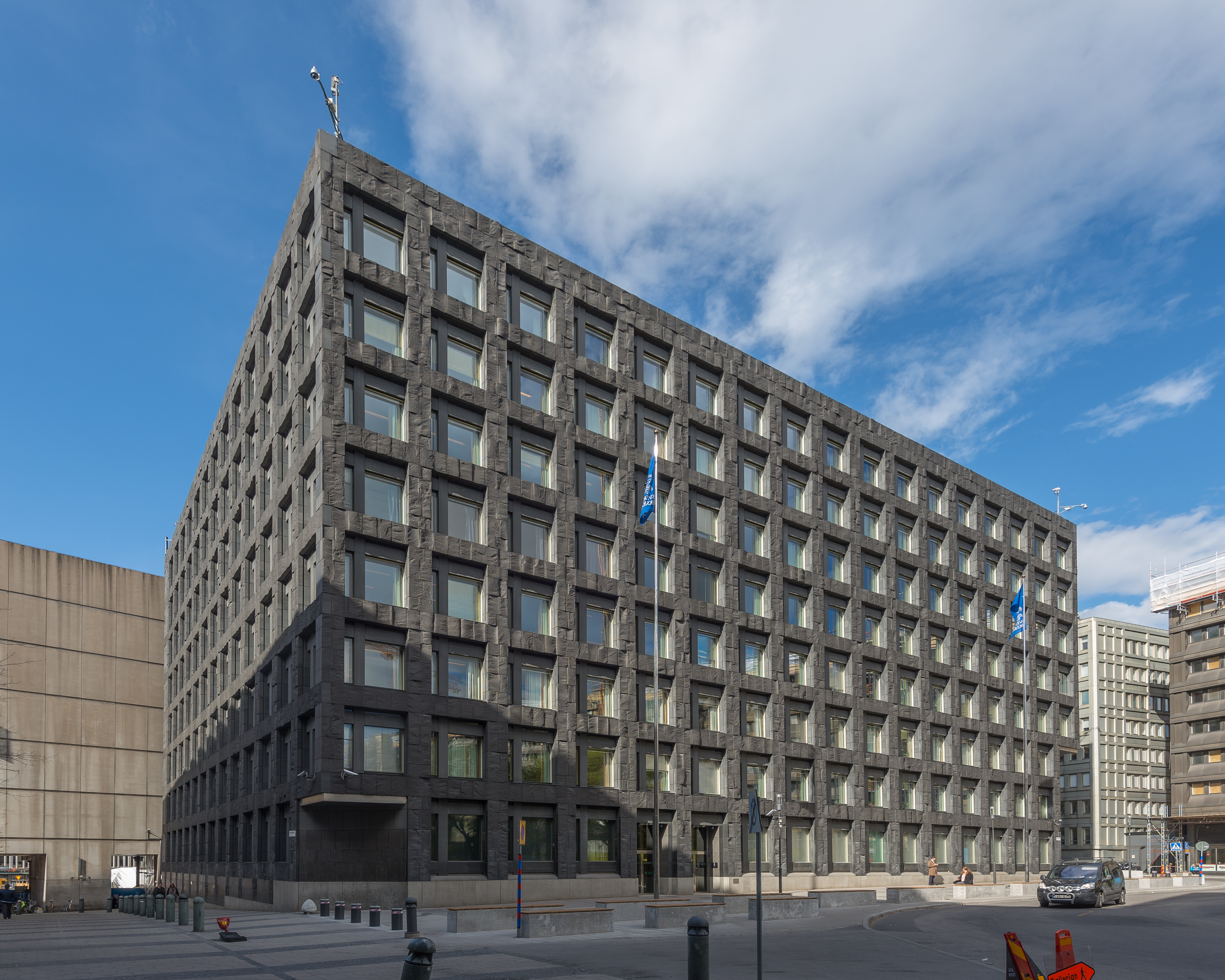
Sveriges Riksbank

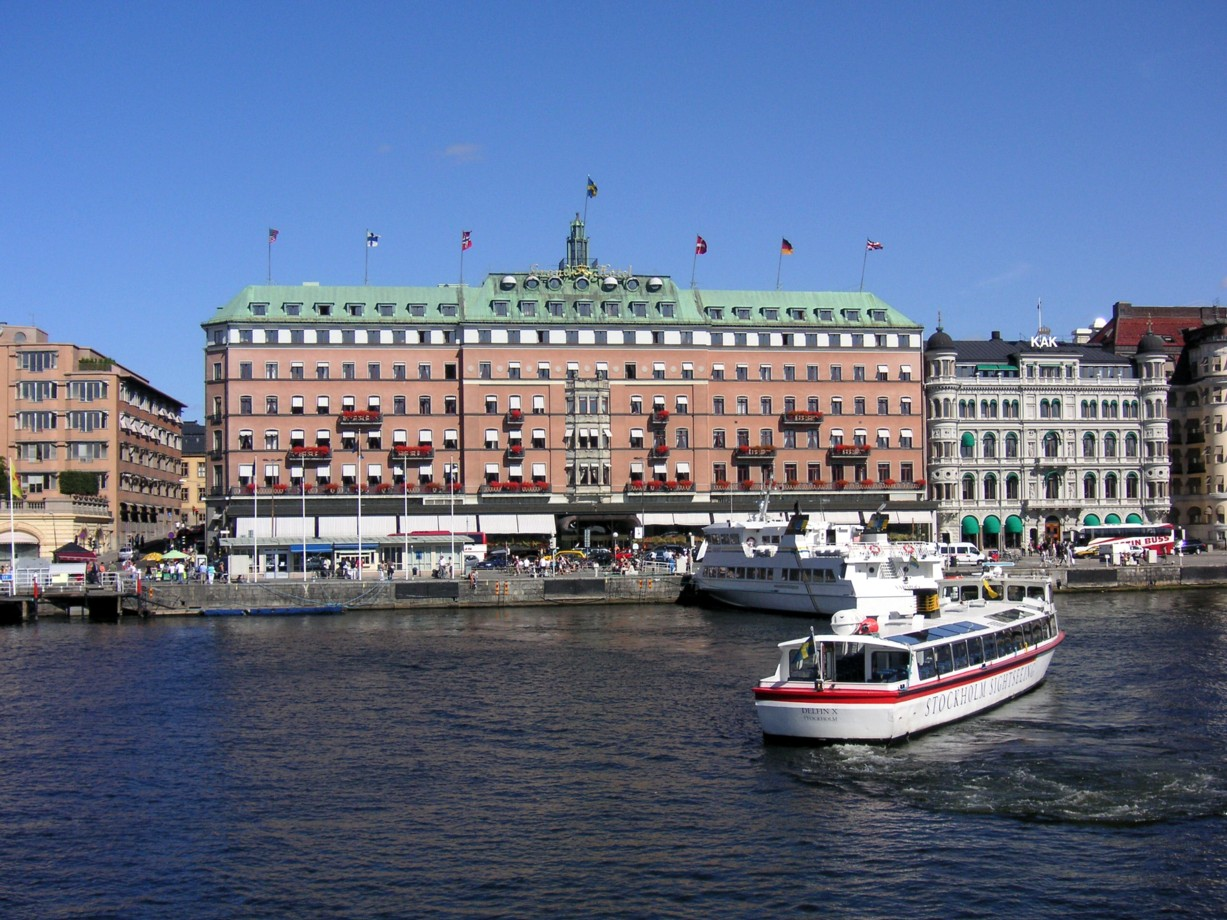
The Grand Hôtel

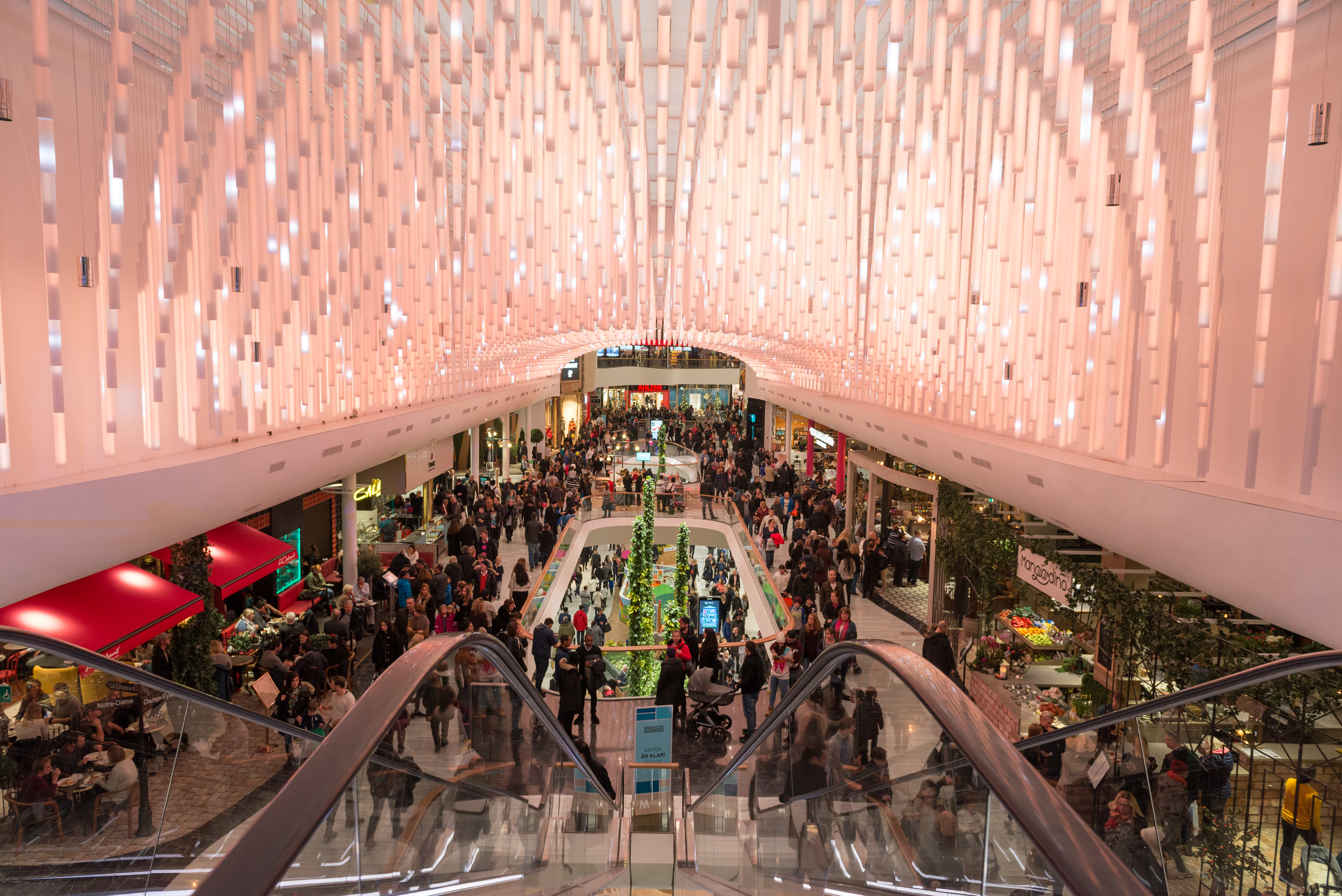
Mall of Scandinavia

Economy of Stockholm

- Financial services in Stockholm
  - Stockholm Stock Exchange
  - Sveriges Riksbank
- Hotels and resorts in Stockholm
  - Grand Hôtel
  - Hotel Rival
  - Infra City
  - Rica Talk Hotel
  - Scandic Hotel Ariadne
  - Scandic Victoria Tower
- Restaurants and cafés in Stockholm
  - Berns Salonger
  - Cattelin
  - Den gröne Jägaren
  - Den Gyldene Freden
  - Frantzén
  - Oaxen Krog
  - Operakällaren
    - Café Opera
- Shopping malls and markets in Stockholm
  - Shopping malls in Stockholm
    - Kista Galleria
    - Mall of Scandinavia
- Tourism in Stockholm
  - Tourist attractions in Stockholm

=== Transportation in Stockholm ===
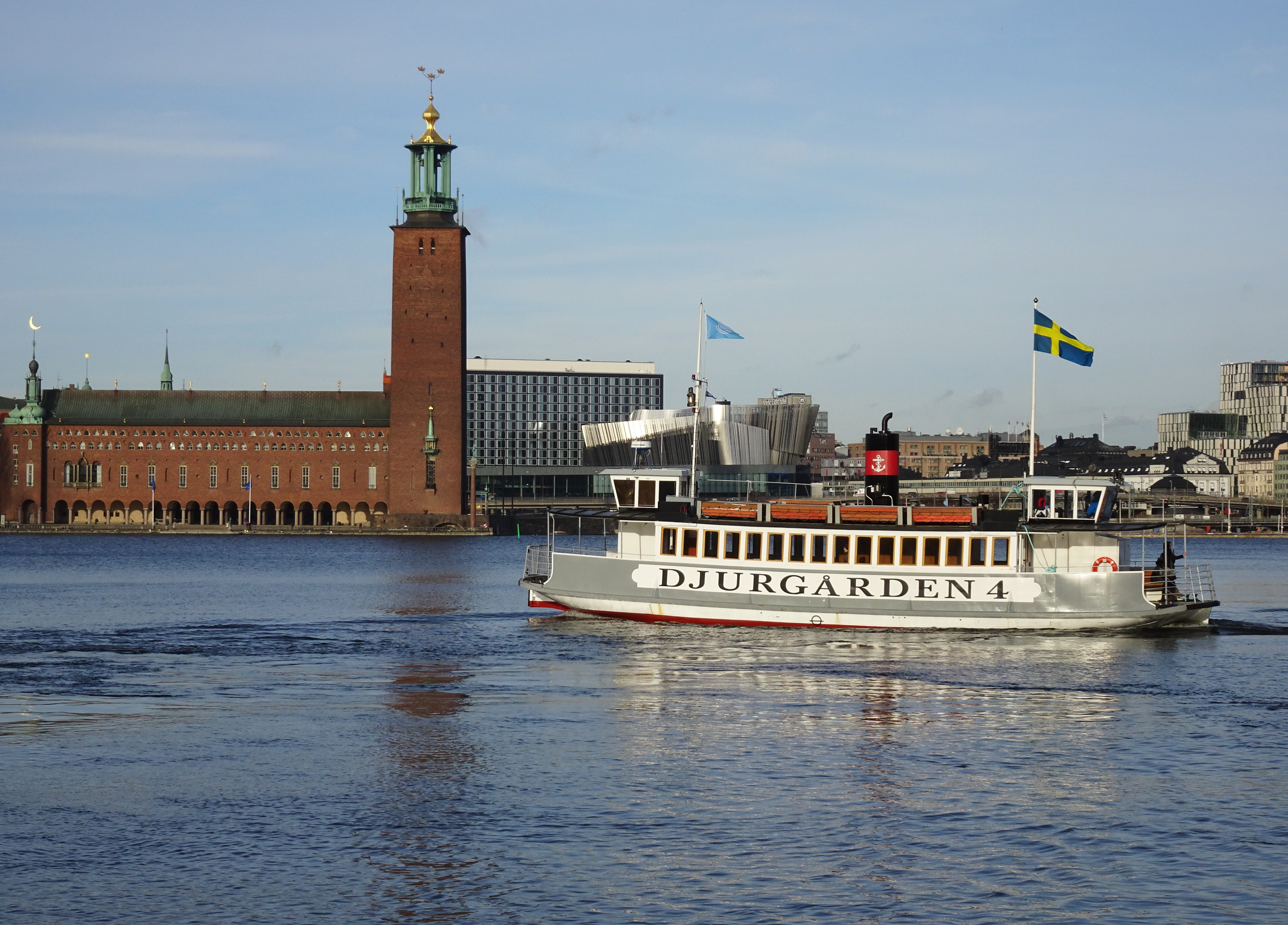
Ferry in front of the City Hall

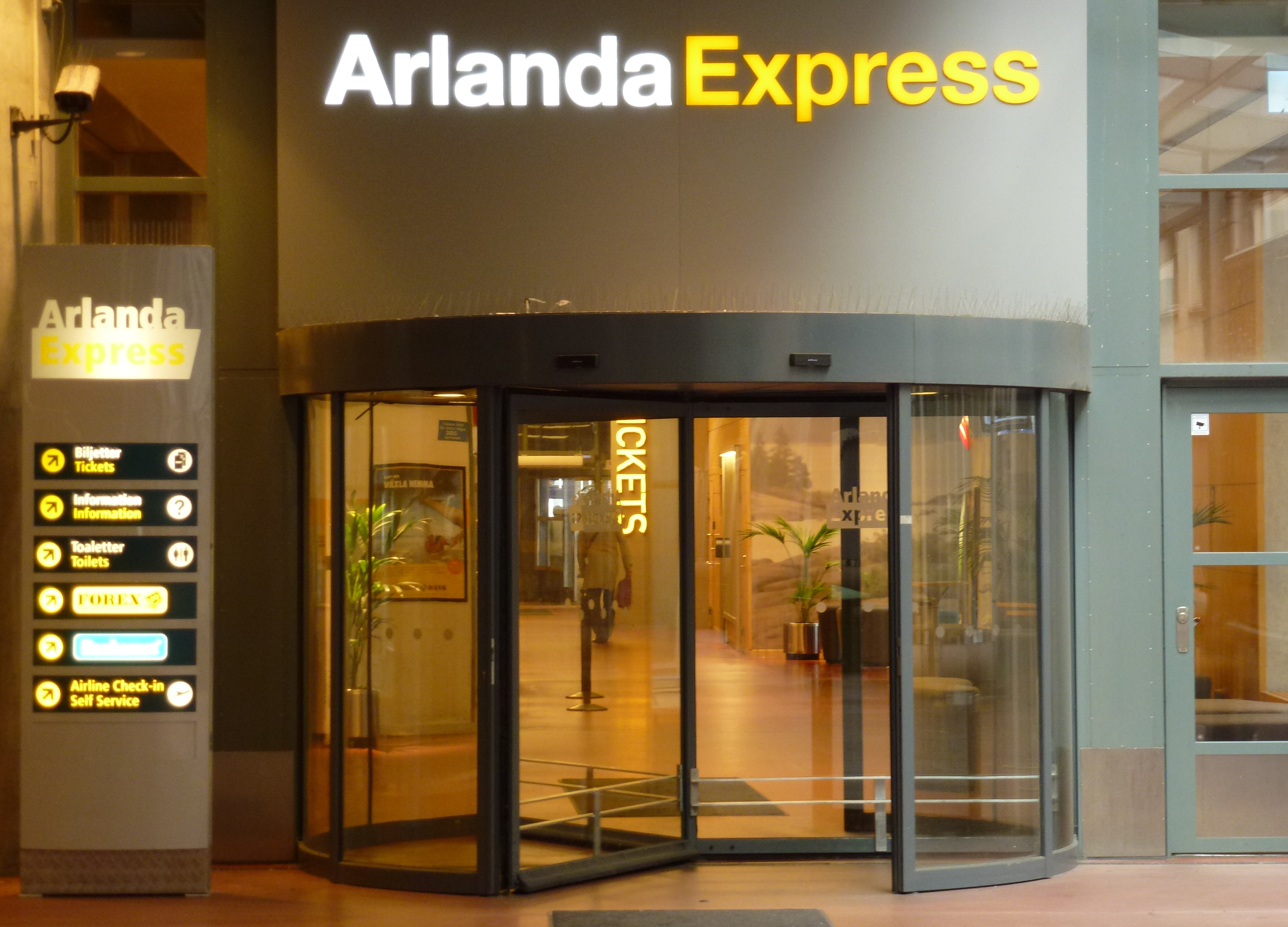
Arlanda Express at Stockholm Central Station

Public transport in Stockholm

- Air transport in Stockholm
  - Airports in Stockholm
    - Stockholm Arlanda Airport
    - Stockholm Bromma Airport
- Maritime transport in Stockholm
  - Boat transport in Stockholm
    - Djurgården ferry
- Road transport in Stockholm
  - Buses in Stockholm
    - Flygbussarna
  - Car sharing in Stockholm
    - DriveNow
  - Cycling in Stockholm
    - Stockholm City Bikes
  - Roads in Stockholm
    - Förbifart Stockholm
    - Stockholm Ring Road

==== Rail transport in Stockholm ====
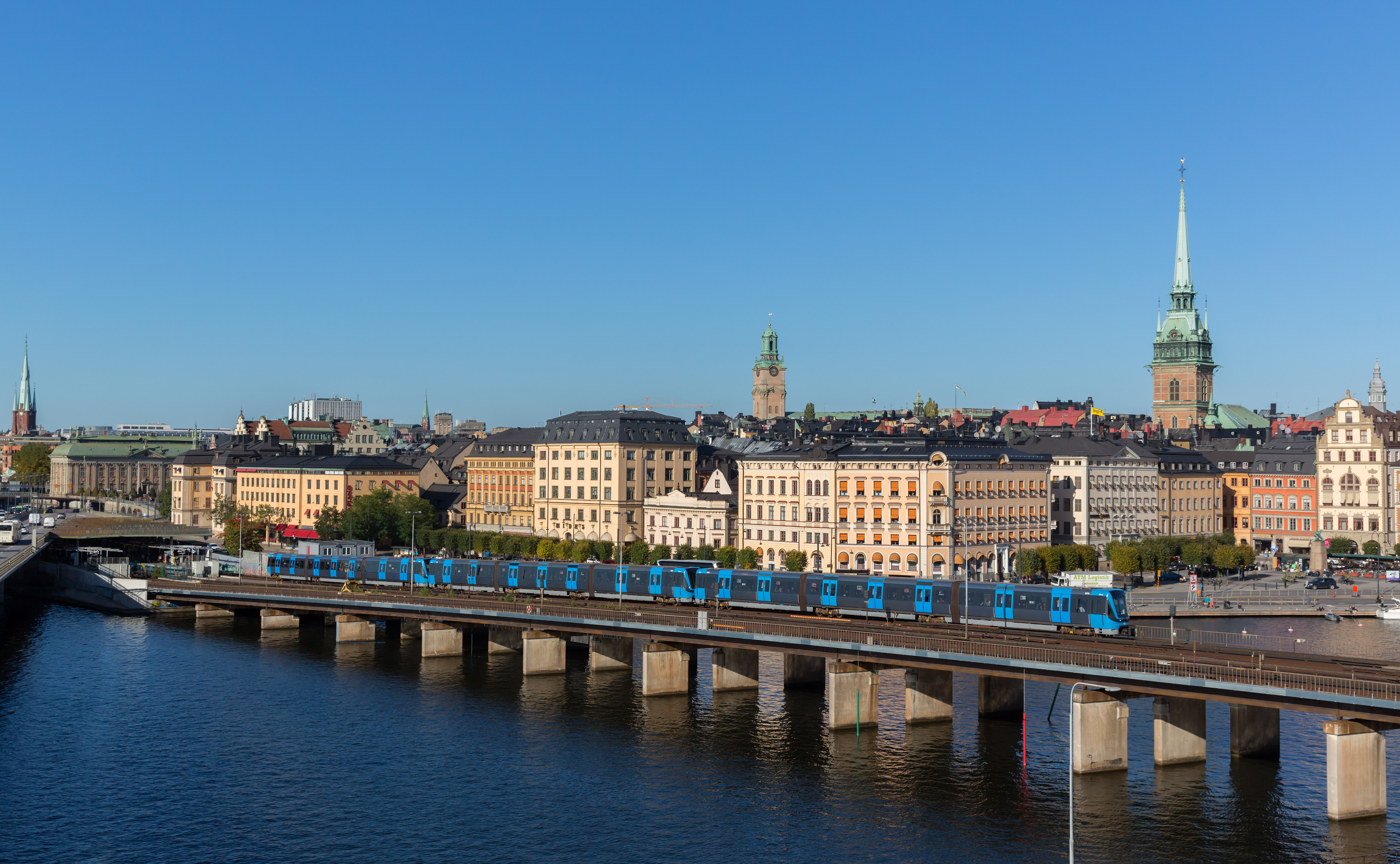
A C20 metrotrain departing from the Gamla stan station

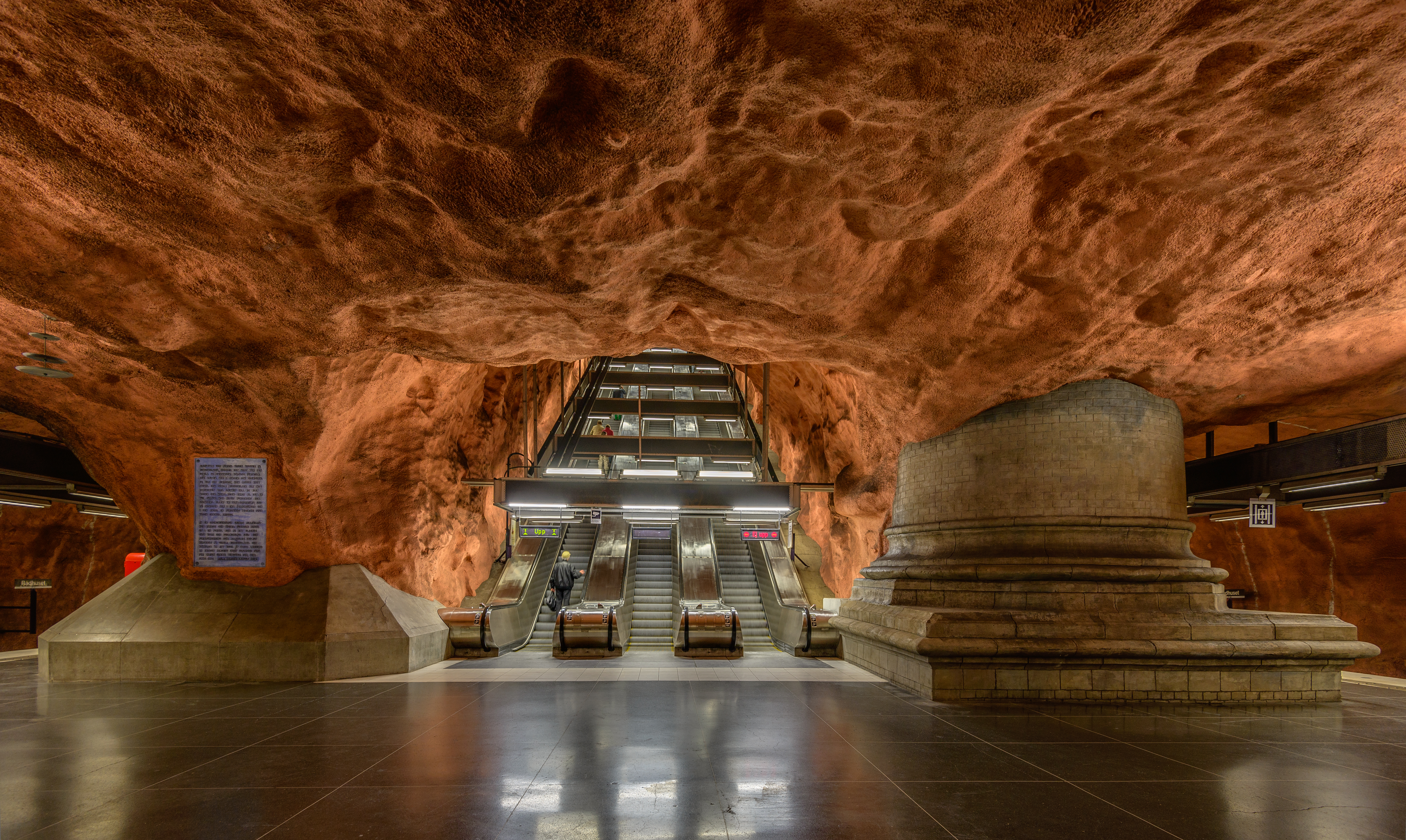
Exposed bedrock at the Rådhuset metro station

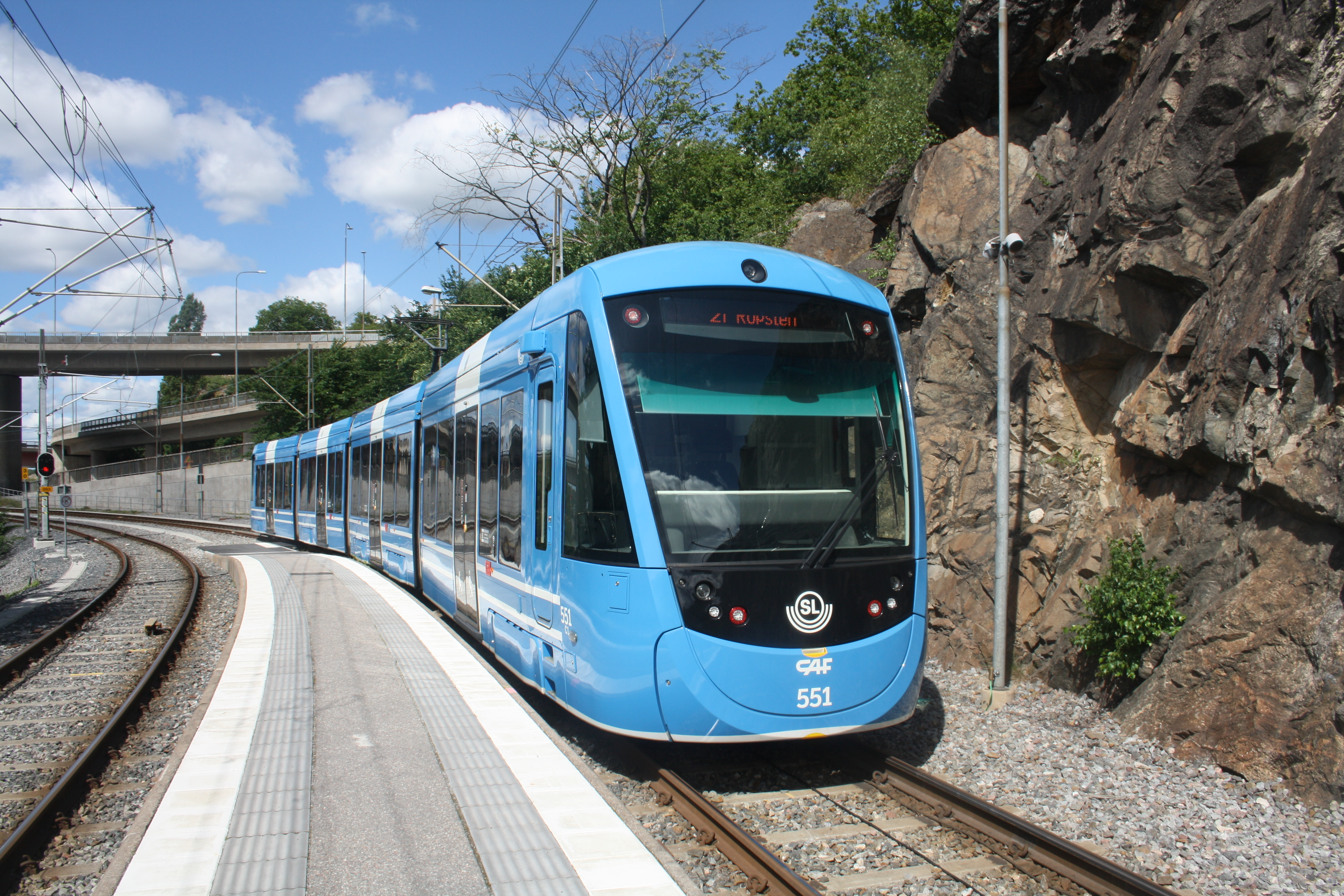
Type A36 tram at Torsvik tram stop

Rail transport in Stockholm

- Arlanda Express
- Skansens bergbana
- Stockholm commuter rail
  - Stockholm City Line
- Railway stations in Stockholm
  - Stockholm Central Station
  - Stockholm City railway station
  - Stockholms östra railway station
  - Stockholms södra railway station
- Stockholm Metro
  - Lines
    - 10 : Kungsträdgården — Hjulsta
    - 11 : Kungsträdgården — Akalla
    - 13 : Norsborg — Ropsten
    - 14 : Fruängen — Mörby centrum
    - 17 : Åkeshov — Skarpnäck
    - 18 : Alvik — Farsta strand
    - 19 : Hässelby strand — Hagsätra
  - Stations
- Trams in Stockholm
  - Djurgårdslinjen
  - Lidingöbanan
  - Nockebybanan
  - Spårväg City
  - Tvärbanan

== Education in Stockholm ==
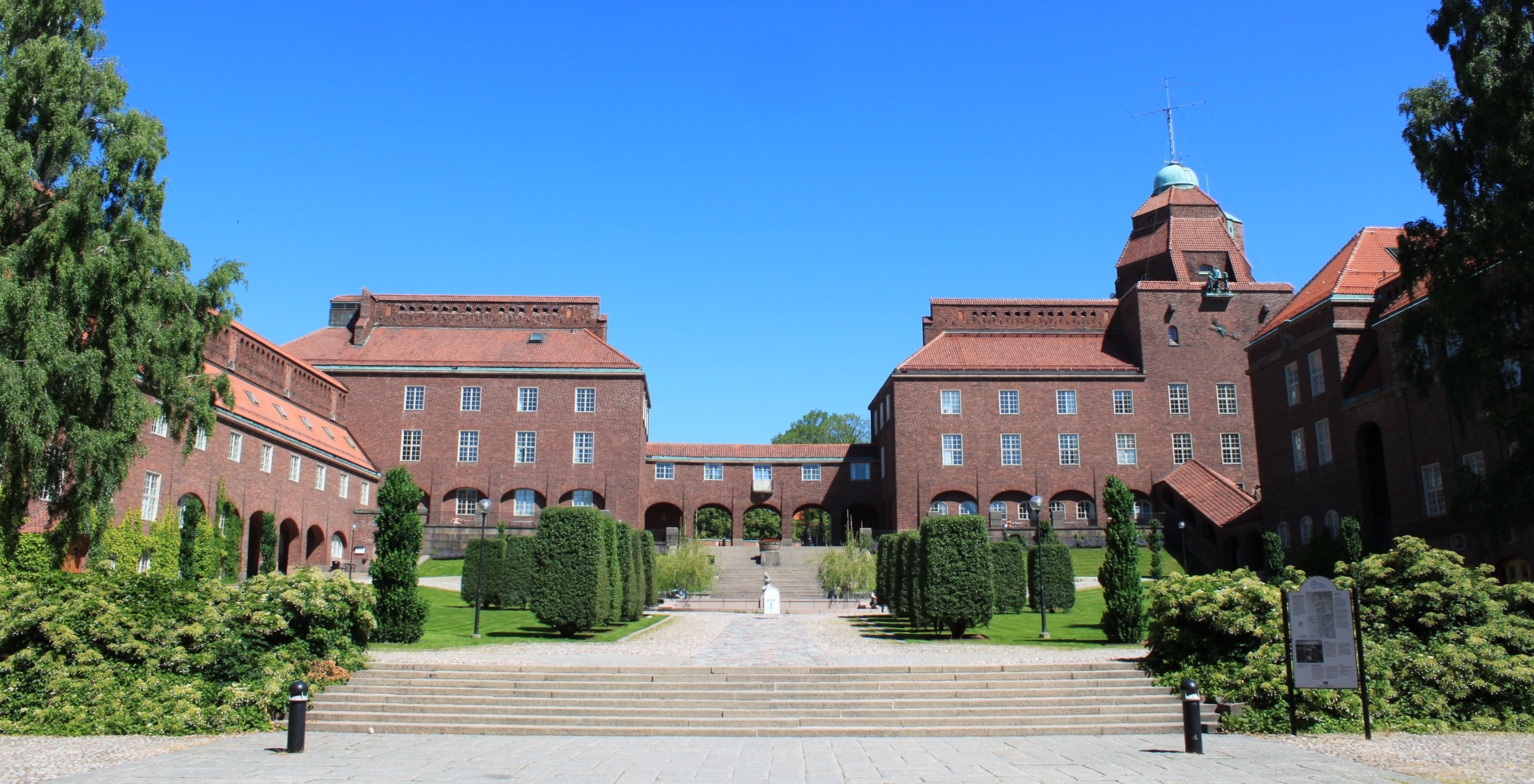
The Royal Institute of Technology

Education in Stockholm

- Universities and colleges in Stockholm
  - Karolinska Institute
  - Royal Institute of Technology
  - Stockholm University
  - Stockholm University of the Arts
- Research institutes in Stockholm
  - Stockholm Environment Institute

== Healthcare in Stockholm ==
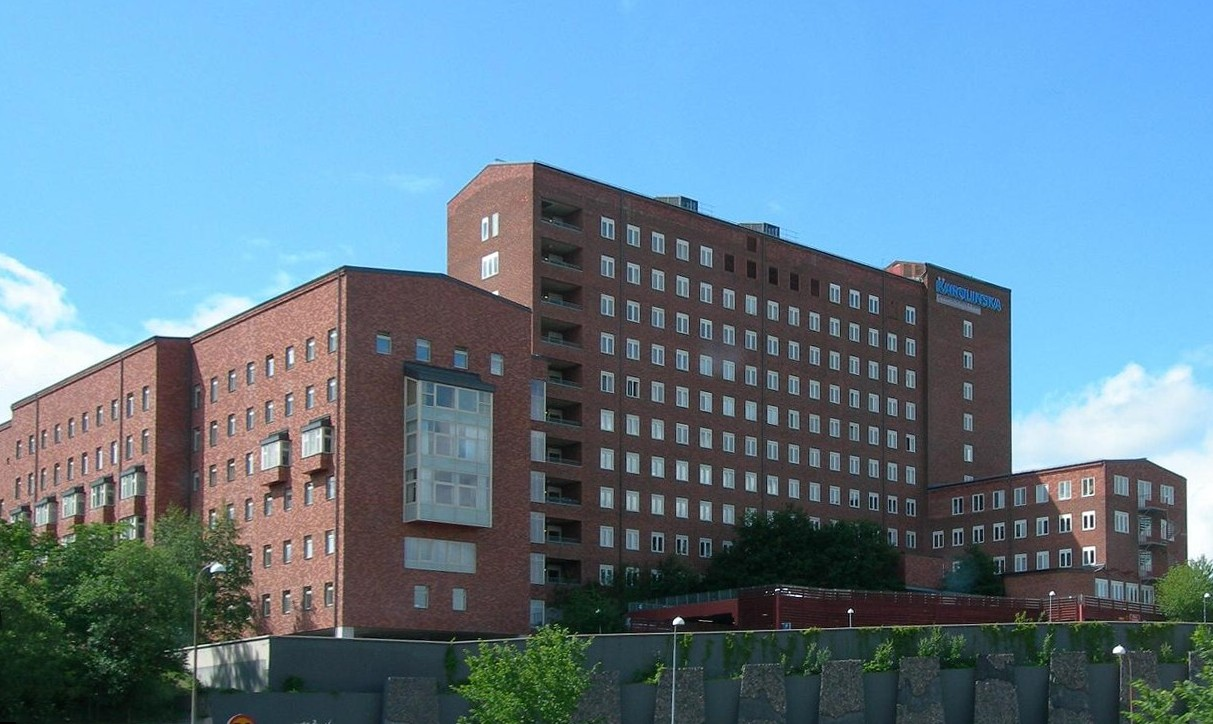
Karolinska University Hospital

Healthcare in Stockholm

- Hospitals in Stockholm
  - Karolinska University Hospital
  - Serafimerlasarettet
  - Sophiahemmet
  - Södersjukhuset

== See also ==
- Outline of geography
