= Växjö Cathedral =

Swedish cathedral

- Växjö domkyrka
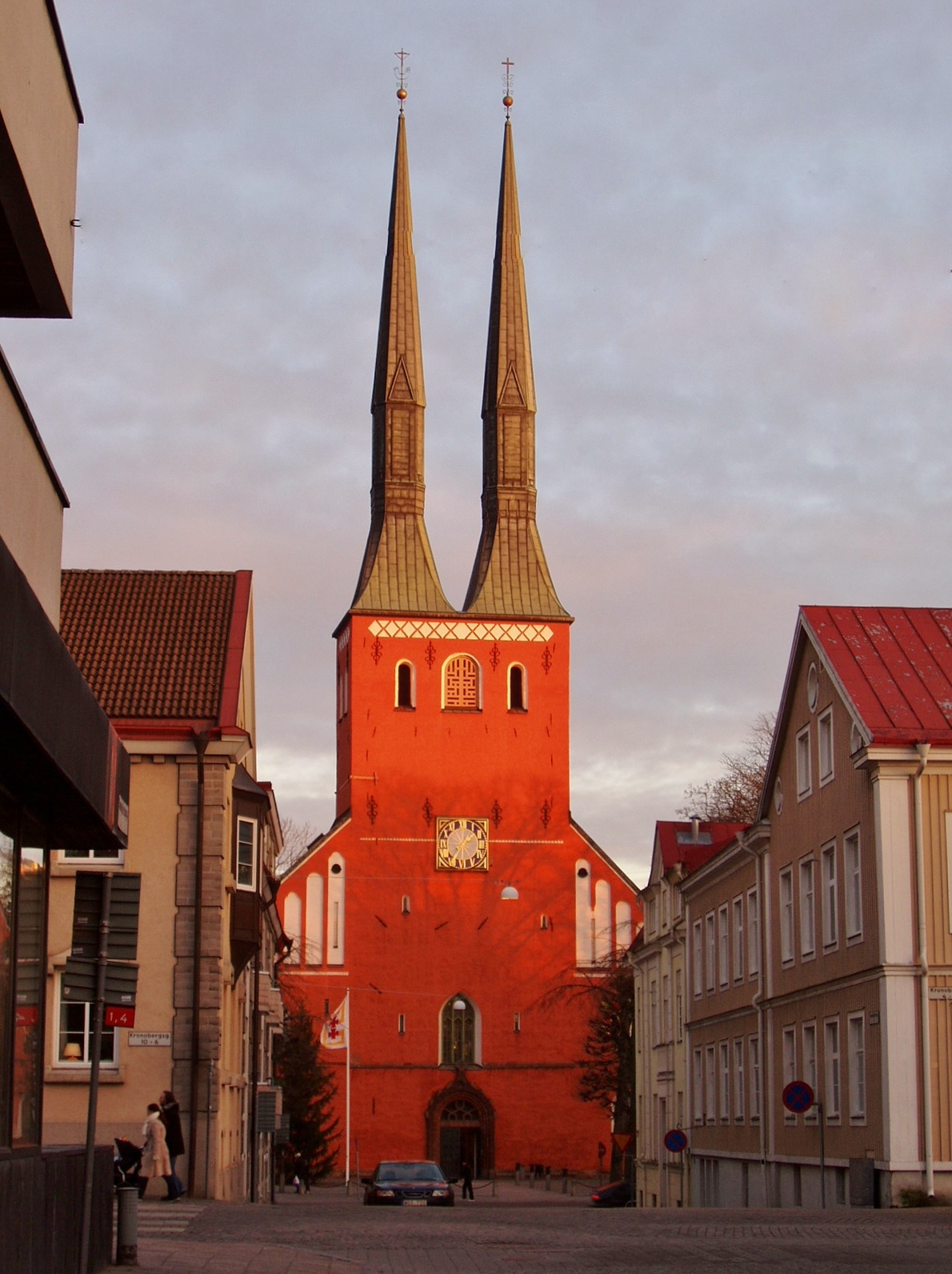
- The west facade of Växjö Cathedral
- Växjö Cathedral
- 56°52′39″N 14°48′43″E
- Location: Växjö
- Country: Sweden
- Denomination: Church of Sweden
- Previous denomination: Roman Catholic Church
- Website: Official site

History
- Founded: 11th century (probable wooden predecessor); 1160s (first stone church)
- Founder: Sigfrid of Sweden (legendary)

Architecture
- Functional status: Active
- Heritage designation: Listed in the buildings database of the Swedish National Heritage Board.
- Architect(s): Carl Georg Brunius; Carl Möller; Kurt von Schmalensee

Administration
- Diocese: Diocese of Växjö

Clergy
- Bishop: Fredrik Modéus

Växjö Cathedral (Swedish: Växjö domkyrka) is a cathedral in Växjö, Sweden. It is the seat of the Bishop of Växjö within the Church of Sweden. According to legend, the cathedral was founded by Saint Sigfrid of Sweden. The first stone church on the site, parts of which are incorporated into the current cathedral, was built in the 1160s. The cathedral has been much altered over time, and its appearance today is largely the result of a far-reaching restoration carried out in the 1950s under the guidance of architect Kurt von Schmalensee. Växjö Cathedral is a hall church with a western tower and a square choir. It was built on a location which was probably used as a marketplace during pre-Christian times. Very few of the cathedral's original furnishings have survived from earlier centuries; most of the works of art adorning the cathedral date from the 20th or 21st centuries, and many of them are made of glass.

== History ==
=== Middle Ages ===
The legend of Saint Sigfrid of Sweden relates how Sigfrid, a missionary from England, chose Växjö as the site to build a cathedral. He was said to also have been buried in the cathedral that he founded. While the legend is largely unreliable as a historical source, it is probable that a wooden church was built on the same site as the current cathedral in the 11th century, during the Christianization of Scandinavia. Coins from the 11th century have been found during excavations within the church, and a preserved Christian runestone from the same century (Rundata number Sm 10), today located next to the choir wall, may be further indication of the early presence of a wooden church on the site.

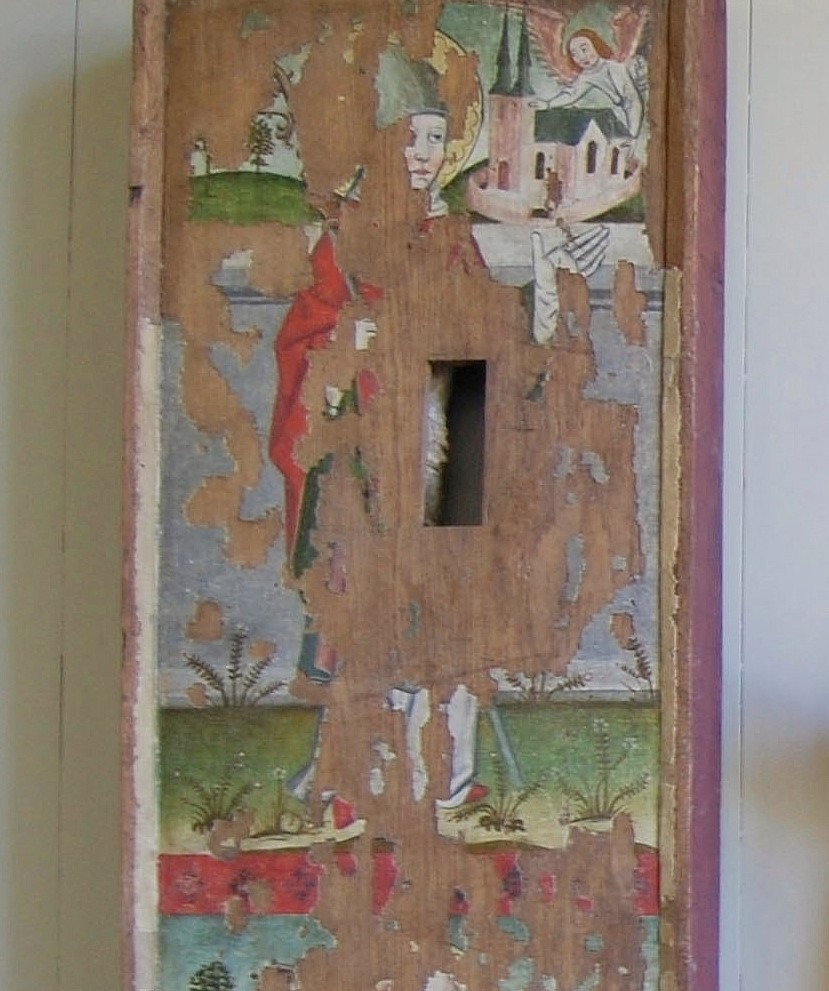
Altarpiece in Långemåla Church; the church in the upper right corner may be a depiction of Växjö Cathedral as it appeared c. 1500.

The Diocese of Växjö was formed at the end of the 1160s, and the construction of a stone church was most likely initiated at approximately the same time. The stone church was probably built around the wooden church, so that it could continue being used while the new building was erected. The foundations of this first stone church were unearthed and examined during a thorough restoration of the cathedral in 1957–58. It consisted of a nave of the same width as the current nave excepting the aisles, a more narrow choir with an apse and an auxiliary building to the north (and possibly also to the south) of the choir. The western tower was added slightly later. Both structurally and stylistically the earliest church was evidently influenced by the architecture of Lund Cathedral, and it was probably similar to Rydaholm Church. The earliest cathedral contained the relics of Saint Sigfrid, who supposedly founded the cathedral and was buried within it. During the Middle Ages, the church was dedicated to Saint Sigfrid and John the Baptist.

The tower of the cathedral was damaged by fire during the latter part of the 13th century, probably during a conflict between King Valdemar of Sweden and his brother Magnus in 1276, or in 1277 when the deposed Valdemar and Eric V of Denmark ravaged the province. The tower had probably been used as an improvised fortification, and suffered damage as a result of the fighting. Afterwards, a repentant Valdemar supplied funds for its reconstruction. The choir and apse were also rebuilt into a square choir and a transept during the 13th century. This probably coincided with the establishment of a proper cathedral chapter in Växjö. A sacristy was also added, probably in the early 14th century; it was robbed by Danish and German soldiers in 1318 and thus clearly existed by then. During the first half of the 14th century, a chapel was added to the south side of the building, and two transepts were also built during the same century. The increased building activity coincided with the expansion of the town of Växjö, which received town privileges in the 14th century. At the end of the century, the shape of the cathedral had become rather irregular as a result of these successive additions and rebuilding schemes.

Major changes were made during the 15th century. The different parts of the church were united into a single coherent room in the form of a hall church; the tower was raised and probably acquired double spires (this is possibly depicted on an altarpiece from c. 1500 in Långemåla Church); a church porch was added in front of the north portal and a new chapel was added to the south. Inside, uniform vaults were built to support the ceiling. The rib vaults that were constructed are of a type which drew on examples from Vadstena Abbey and the earlier architecture of the Teutonic Order. Very similar vaults exist in Saint Lawrence's Church in Söderköping. An inscription in the church, which has since vanished, stated that the vaults were finished in 1509 and made by a mason from Linköping. These changes were likely to have been carried out between approximately 1460 and 1500. A chantry chapel was added in an extension south of the tower in the 15th century .

=== Changes after the Reformation ===
Following the Reformation in Sweden, the cathedral was converted into a Lutheran cathedral. In the process, it lost many of its sources of income. Furthermore, the church was plundered and burnt by Danish troops in 1570, during the Northern Seven Years' War. King John III of Sweden granted the citizens of Växjö three years of reprieve from taxation following the attack, so that they would have funds to repair the cathedral. Nevertheless, repairs took six years, and the tower was not fully repaired until 1585. During the reparations, the spires of the church were redesigned, and a mechanical clock was installed on the west façade of the church. By the end of the 16th century, the cathedral had attained approximately the size and appearance it has today. In 1612, Danish troops again entered Växjö and used the cathedral as their quarters; during this time the pews were destroyed and the archive of the cathedral burnt, and in 1629 the spires were damaged in a storm and again had to be replaced.

In 1740, one of the spires was struck by lightning, which led to another devastating fire. The entire roof and the uppermost part of the tower were destroyed, as were the vaults in the east part of the church. The last remaining medieval furnishings were also lost. Repairs started in 1741 and would last into the 1770s. The medieval roof was not reconstructed but replaced with a hipped roof, and the two spires of the tower replaced with a single tower in a Classical style. The new tower was designed by Carl Hårleman and somewhat altered by Carl Fredrik Adelcrantz after Hårleman's death in 1753.

=== Changes by Carl Georg Brunius and Carl Möller ===
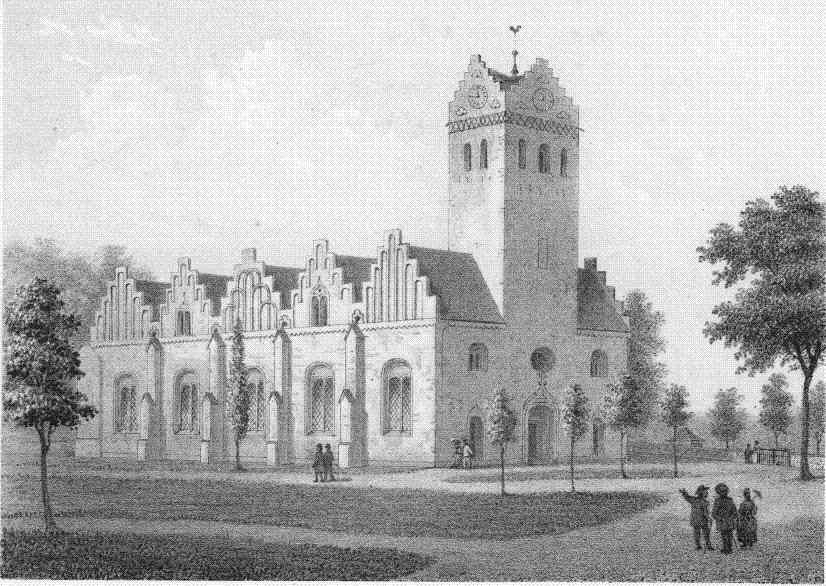
The appearance of the cathedral following the reconstruction by Brunius

Following several fires in Växjö during the late 18th and early 19th century, concerns were raised about the fire safety of the cathedral. The roof was considered to be particularly at risk. The bishop, writer Esaias Tegnér, together with county governor Count Carl Mörner, decided to hire architect Carl Georg Brunius to draw up plans for a reconstruction. Brunius proposed a radical change to the exterior of the church: placing the nave and choir under a low gable roof while at the same time replacing the roof over the aisles with several gable roofs in an angle to the nave, and ending in stepped gables. The tower spire and the choir were also to be decorated with stepped gables. The inspiration for this design came from German architecture and medieval city churches in Scania. Despite opposition from the government agency for the administration of state buildings (Överintendentsämbetet), Brunius' plans were largely executed and the cathedral was rebuilt between 1849 and 1854. Further repairs and minor changes were made in the 1860s and 1880s.

Additional far-reaching changes were made 1898–99, when the interior was re-decorated to designs by architect Carl Möller. A new sacristy was built, a new clock installed and stained glass windows inserted. At the same time all the vaults and walls of the church were painted with murals, and Gothic Revival pews, choir stalls, an altarpiece and altar rail were made for the church by local artisans to designs by Möller. The new interior gave the cathedral a consistent medievalist appearance.

=== Renovation 1958–1960 ===
Brunius had predicted that his renovation would last for 100 years, which proved to be right; by 1940 the need for repairs was again imminent. An initial plan to restore the cathedral was prepared by architect Erik Fant and was limited to repairing the roof and walls and installing a new heating system. After the death of Fant in 1953, architect Kurt von Schmalensee took over the responsibility and presented several proposals, including an idea for a more thorough reconstruction of the cathedral. This proposal was accepted in 1958. Between 1958 and 1960 the cathedral was substantially rebuilt in an effort to recreate some of the cathedral's earlier, medieval appearance. New floors were laid, the walls and vaults were strengthened and partially rebuilt, a new southern portal was erected, the windows were changed, the tower was altered and two new spires were built. The exterior was painted red, traces of which had been discovered when repairing the walls. The reconstruction was largely seen as a success at the time.

Less extensive repairs were also carried out in the late 20th century.

== Location and surroundings ==
Växjö Cathedral lies at the outskirts of the oldest part of the town of Växjö. When the cathedral was built, its south façade was less than 20 metres (22 yd) from the shore of Växjö Lake. It is possible that this was the location of a marketplace during pre-Christian times, and that the unusually low-lying location of the cathedral was chosen so it would be close to a well-established place of gathering. Due to water control measures taken during the 18th and 19th centuries, the shore is now considerably further away from the cathedral, which now stands in a park laid out in 1879. From the Middle Ages until the 19th century, the cathedral was surrounded by several buildings related to the church, but only the former home of the cathedral school remains, dating from the 17th century. In the park surrounding the cathedral, on ground which was formerly a cemetery, there is a bronze statue commemorating Bishop Esaias Tegnér, created in 1926 and designed by sculptor Arvid Källström; it is located north of the cathedral, between the cathedral and the former school house. In front of the cathedral there is a statue commemorating Saint Sigfrid, installed in 1999 and designed by sculptor Peter Linde.

== Architecture ==
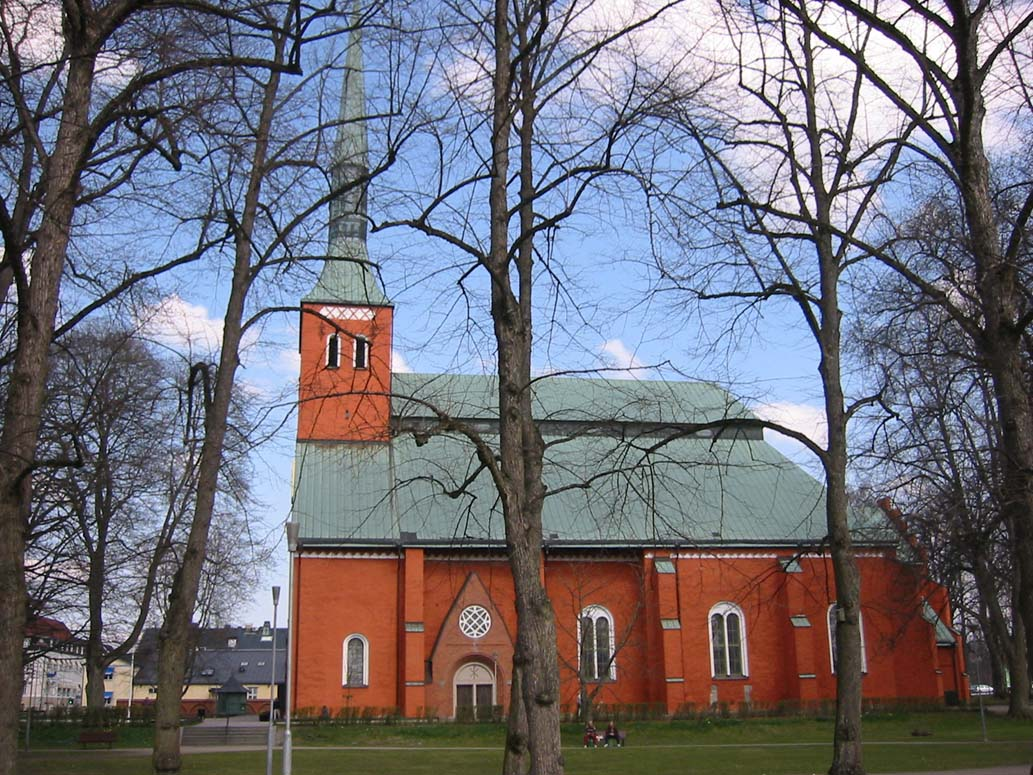
The cathedral viewed from the south

The oldest parts of the current building are the base of the tower and the pillars of the nave; they incorporate building material from the 12th century. The walls of the upper part of the tower largely date from the end of the Middle Ages, though as noted above, the appearance of the tower has changed substantially throughout the centuries. North of the tower is an addition from the 1750s, while the southern extension of the tower is medieval. The choir walls are also medieval, the remnants of an originally larger choir from the 13th century. The easternmost parts of both aisles date from 1849 to 1850, and the southern annex to the choir was built as a sacristy in 1898–99.

The exterior of the cathedral is predominantly painted red, with the dressed stone around windows, blind arcades and other stone elements painted white. The building consists of a nave with two aisles with a rectangular floor plan, a broad western tower and a square choir. The large windows in the south and north walls date from Brunius' reconstruction. The west façade is decorated with blind arcades created during the major restoration in the 1950s. The tower supports two tall spires and has nine bell openings. The main entrance to the cathedral is located in the base of the tower, in the west façade. Its current appearance dates from the middle of the 19th century; the copper-covered doors and the ornamental window in the tympanum are from the 1950s. A second entrance, built in the 1950s, is located in the south wall. A single copper roof covers both the nave, the aisles and the choir.

=== Interior and furnishings ===
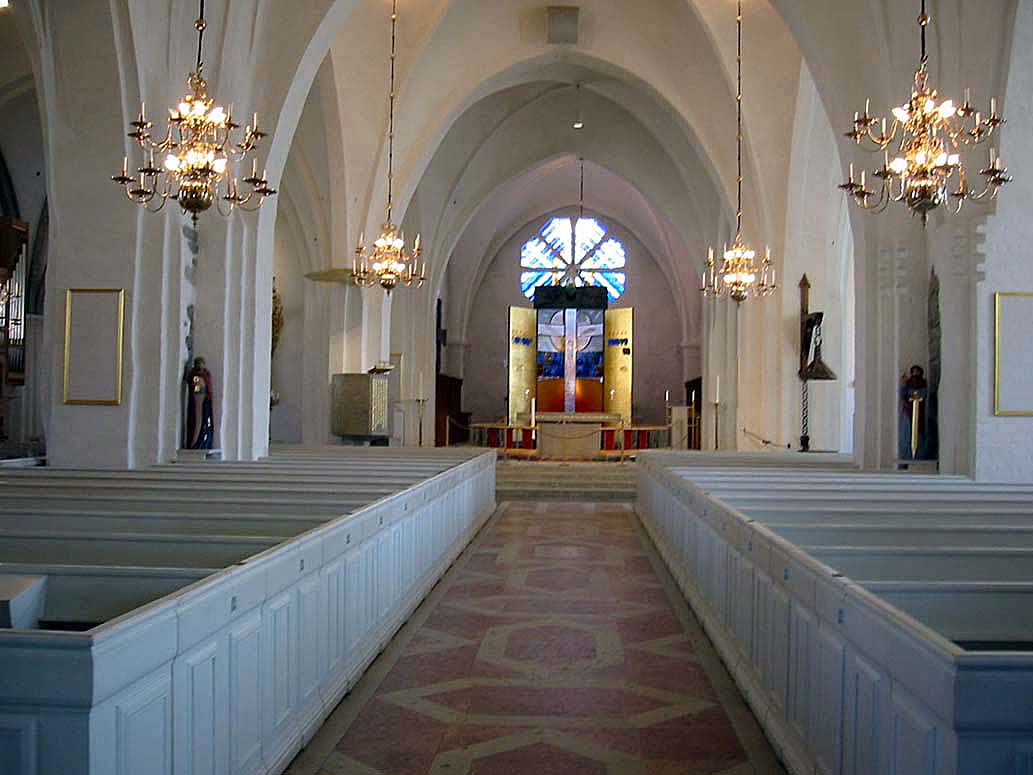
View of the interior towards the east

Växjö Cathedral is a hall church, with nave and aisles of equal height. It is three bays wide and four bays long. The interior is painted white and uniformly lit by windows of approximately equal size, all except one dating from the 1950s renovation. The ceiling is supported by 13 vaults, of which 7 are medieval. The medieval vaults are mostly located in the westernmost part of the church. Traces of medieval murals have been restored in the south-west corner (the former chantry chapel).

Inside the main entrance is a windbreak with glass doors decorated by artist Irene Jarz and installed in 1996. The entrance also contains a memorial stone from the 18th century, containing a brief history of the cathedral, and above the doorway leading to the nave there is a stucco relief depicting Christ giving a blessing, by artist Kajsa Mattas. Inside the nave, a stone marker decorated with a stylised "S" and three crosses has been placed in the crossing, where it is likely that the body of Saint Sigfrid would have been interred. The present altarpiece of the cathedral was installed in 2002. It is made of glass, and designed by glass artist Bertil Vallien. A former altar painting, from 1733 by Georg Engelhard Schröder, hangs in the north aisle. The baptismal font is also a work in glass, by artist Göran Wärff. Another piece of glass art is a candle holder located to the west of the entrance to the nave; it was made in the late 20th century by Erik Höglund with metal parts by Lars Larsson. The pulpit and the former baptismal font were made by Jan Brazda in connection with the restoration in the 1950s. The former chantry chapel is screened off from the rest of the church by glass doors, also decorated by Irene Jarz, and contains an altar and cross by Jan Brazda. There are also two stained glass windows designed by Bo Beskow in the chantry chapel. The church chandeliers are from several different periods; in the westernmost part of both aisles are Gothic Revival chandeliers which were probably donated by opera singer Christina Nilsson. There are two wooden sculptures from the 20th century depicting Saint Peter and Saint Paul in the nave, the work of sculptor Eva Spångberg.

The cathedral has a carillon installed in 1962 and inaugurated the next year; it consists of 27 bells. The cathedral also has five church bells.

Växjö Cathedral has three church organs. The largest has a façade made in the 1770s, though the mechanism of the organ dates from 2002, when it was last renovated. Two smaller organs are in the north aisle (from 1984) and in the south aisle (from 2001).

== Use and heritage status ==
Växjö Cathedral is the seat of the Bishop of Växjö within the Church of Sweden, and also serves as a parish church within the parish of Växjö (Växjö stads- och domkyrkoförsamling). The cathedral hosts regular services and is used as a concert venue as well. It is a listed building in the buildings database of the Swedish National Heritage Board.

== Works cited ==
- Gustafsson, Evald; Ullén, Marian (1970). Växjö domkyrka [Växjö Cathedral] (PDF). Sveriges kyrkor, konsthistoriskt inventarium (in Swedish). Vol. 136. Stockholm: Almqvist & Wiksell. ISSN 0284-1894.
- Gustafsson, Evald (1962). "Själakor och consistorium i Växjö domkyrka" [Chapel and chapter in Växjö Cathedral] (PDF). Fornvännen. Journal of Swedish Antiquarian Research (in Swedish): 112–144. ISSN 0015-7813.
- Lissing, Thomas (2006). Karaktärisering och kulturhistorisk värdering: Växjö domkyrka [Characterisation and cultural historical evaluation: Växjö Cathedral] (in Swedish). Smålands museum.
- Ullén, Marian (1996). "Gotikens kyrkobyggande" [Church building during the Gothic era]. In Augustsson, Jan-Erik (ed.). Signums svenska konsthistoria. Den gotiska konsten [Signum's history of Swedish art. Gothic art] (in Swedish). Lund: Signum. pp. 37–134. ISBN 91-87896-23-0.
