= Kungsmadskolan =

Kungsmadskolan, Växjö
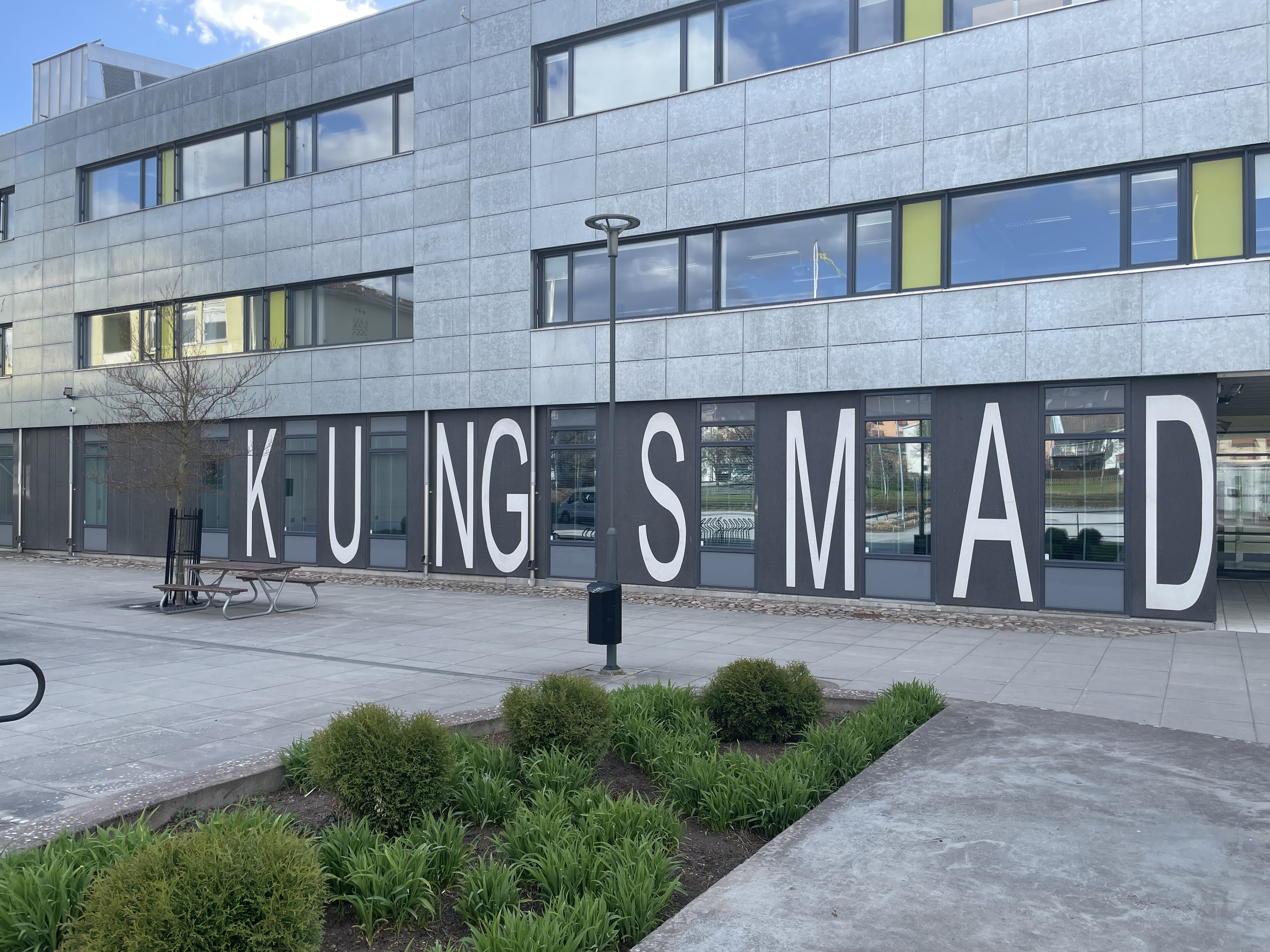

Location
- Växjö, Kronoberg County; Sweden
- Coordinates: 56°53′07″N 14°48′44″E

Information
- Type: Public
- Established: 1962
- School district: Växjö
- Grades: 10th, 11th and 12th
- Enrollment: 1011 (2021)
- Website: www.vaxjo.se/kungsmad

Kungsmadskolan is a high school in Växjö, Sweden. It has 1011 students (2021). It is located just north of the city center, in the city district Hov.

== Programs ==
The school offers the following programs:

- Construction And Civil Engineering
- Economics
- Vehicle And Transport
- Sales And Service
- Hair And Makeup Stylist
- Industrial Technology
- Restaurant And Food
- Social Sciences
