= St. John's Church, Stockholm =

St. John's Catholic Church
- Sankt Johannes katolska kyrka
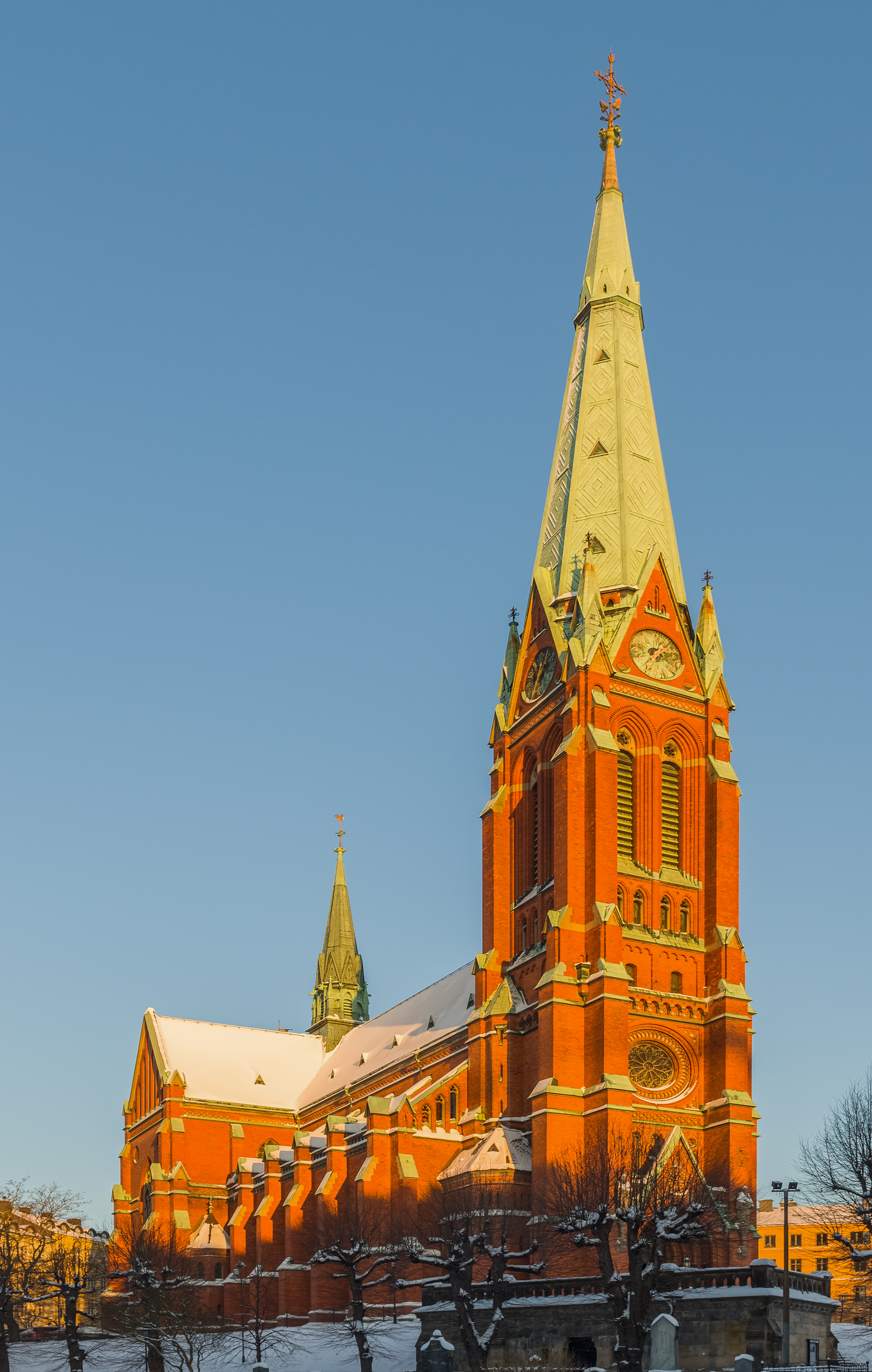
- St. John's Catholic Church
- St. John's Catholic Church
- 59°20′22″N 18°03′53″E
- Location: Norrmalm, Stockholm
- Country: Sweden
- Denomination: Catholic Church
- Previous denomination: Church of Sweden

History
- Dedication: Saint John the Evangelist
- Consecrated: 25 May 1890, Feast of Pentecost

Architecture
- Architect: Carl Möller
- Style: Gothic Revival
- Completed: 1890

Administration
- Diocese: Diocese of Stockholm
- Parish: St. John's Parish

St. John's Catholic Church (Swedish: Sankt Johannes katolska kyrka) is a church located in the Norrmalm district of Stockholm, Sweden. It was designed by Carl Möller in the Gothic Revival style and completed in 1890. In December, 2024 the Church of Sweden announced the building would be sold to the Catholic Diocese of Stockholm effective immediately.

== History ==
St John's Church started with a wooden chapel built on the site in 1651. In 1883, the architect Carl Möller won a competition to design a permanent stone church on the site. The church was completed in 1890 and was consecrated on Pentecost by the Archbishop of Uppsala, Anton Niklas Sundberg in the presence of King Oscar II. The church was constructed in neo-gothic style with a tower 70 metres (230 ft) tall. In 2021, the church had to be closed for renovation after discovery of an eight-ton counterweight that had rusted in the tower. During renovation, the cemetery was cordoned off. The restoration cost was estimated at 43 million Swedish krona, which rose to 226 million SEK and it was stated that St John's would have to be demolished if the money was not raised. It was discovered that the church was built using contemporary modern construction techniques, which meant it was impossible to fully judge the state of the building due to steel structure in the spire being integrated and a counterweight being used similar to ones used in early skyscrapers. Eventually the money for restoration was found but the church was left with a 56 million SEK maintenance debt.

During the 21st century, the church had been leased from the Church of Sweden by the Roman Catholic Church to minister to Polish Catholics in Sweden. Most Lutherans moved to worship at nearby St Stephen's Church while St John's was being renovated. In 2024, following a decline in worshippers in the Church of Sweden, the church announced that it had been sold to the Polish Catholic Mission. The sale was made to the Catholics to ensure that the church remained in Christian hands, given a recent tendency of Swedish redundant churches being turned into community centres or breweries. Despite the sale, the bell tower and the church's cemetery would remain property of the Church of Sweden.

== See also ==
- List of churches in Stockholm
