= Eva Spångberg =

Swedish artist

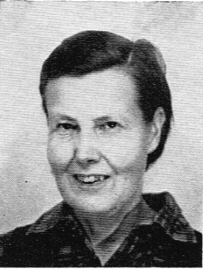
Eva Spångberg in 1960

Eva Margareta Spångberg (2 April 1923 – 8 November 2011) was a Swedish sculptor. She made a large number of wooden sculptures for Swedish churches, and was born in Östhammar Municipality. Her family was not particularly religious, but she started attending church on her own from an early age. After graduating from school she wanted to study medicine but her grades were insufficient, and she instead entered a school to become a nurse. However she contracted polio during her studies and consequently was forced to abandon them. At that time she had already started to practice woodworking and was making sculptures at home.

She received a stipend to study wood sculpting in Oberammergau in Germany for a year. When she returned to Sweden, she received her first commission from the Church of Sweden, to make a crucifix for a church, Guldhedskyrkan, in Gothenburg. During her life, she eventually made more than 500 wooden sculptures for churches in Sweden and around the Baltic Sea, including Storkyrkan (the cathedral of Stockholm) and Växjö Cathedral. Her works include nativity scenes, Madonnas and other biblical subjects. In a vote conducted among the readers of the official magazine of the Church of Sweden, she was voted the most important woman within the Church of Sweden during the 20th century.

Her former home in Sävsjö Municipality, Björkelund, is today a museum about her life and work.
