= Kurt von Schmalensee =

Swedish architect

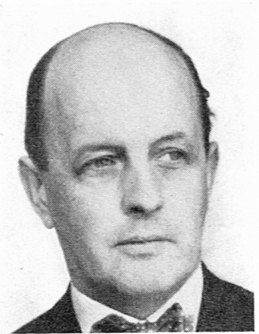
Kurt von Schmalensee

Kurt von Schmalensee (5 September 1896 – 13 July 1972) was a Swedish architect.

== Biography ==
Kurt von Schmalensee was born in Gullspång Municipality. His father was an inspector of railway stations and his brother Artur von Schmalensee was also an architect. Kurt von Schmalensee studied architecture at the KTH Royal Institute of Technology and the Royal Swedish Academy of Fine Arts in Stockholm. He finished his studies in 1924 and in 1925 began working as an architect for Kooperativa Förbundet. Between 1929 and 1961 he was city architect in Norrköping, and large parts of the modern development of the city is attributable to his work. He was part of a group of architects who introduced and propagated Functionalism in Sweden. As such he participated at the Stockholm Exhibition of 1930. He designed, i.a., the Art Museum of Norrköping. He was also active as a restorer of churches throughout Sweden, notably Växjö Cathedral.
