= Sigfrid of Sweden =

11th-century missionary-bishop

Saint Sigfrid of Sweden
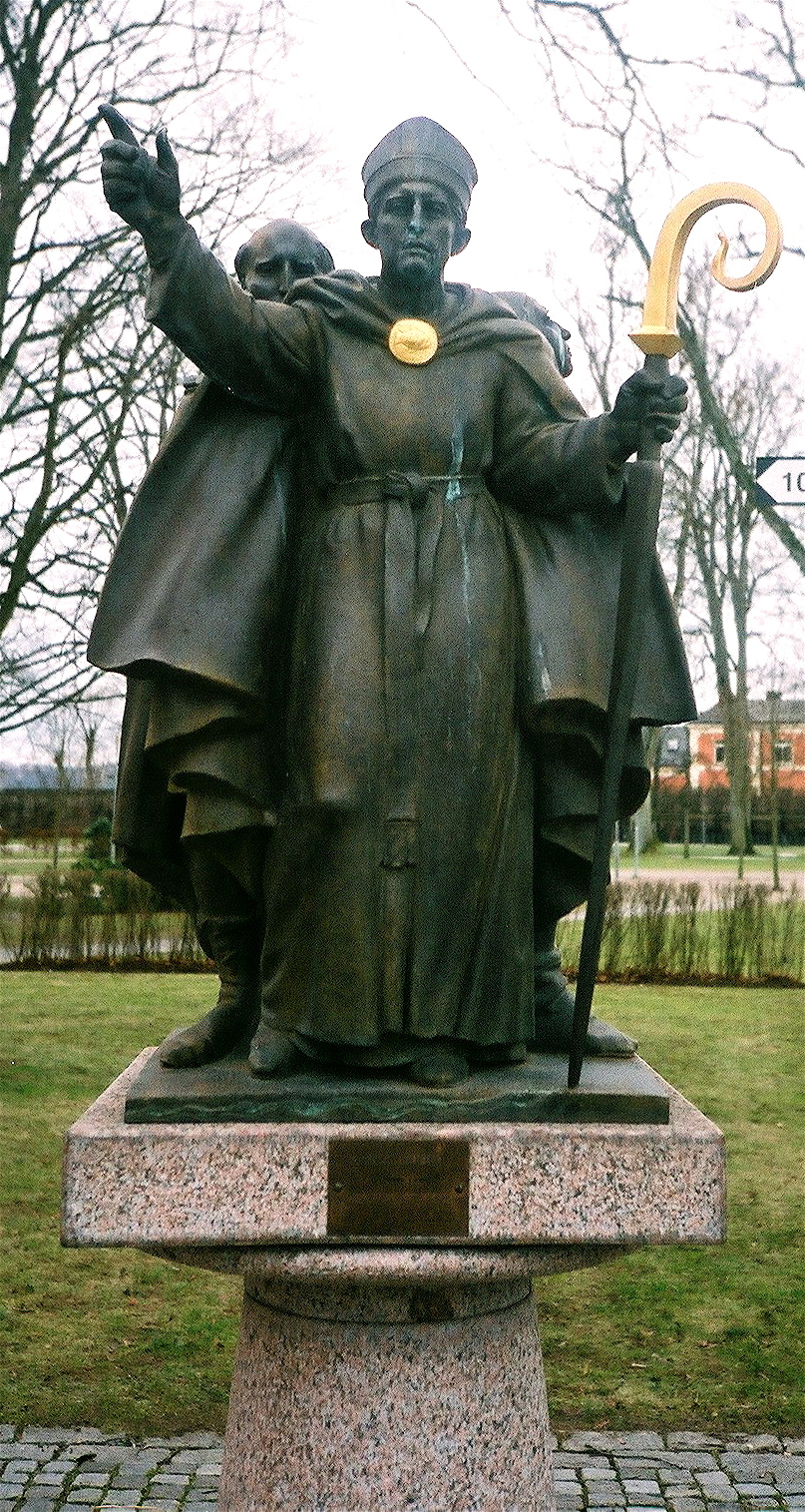
- Statue of St Sigfrid at Växjö Cathedral

Apostle of Sweden
- Born: Unknown (10th century); England
- Died: Unknown (11th century); Växjö
- Venerated in: Eastern Orthodox Church; Roman Catholic Church; Anglican Communion
- Major shrine: Växjö
- Feast: 15 February
- Attributes: bishop carrying three severed heads; bishop carrying three loaves of bread (misrepresentation of the heads); baptizing King Olof of Sweden; traveling in a ship with 2 other bishops; bishop menaced by devils,
- Patronage: Sweden

Saint Sigfrid of Sweden (Swedish: Sigfrid, Latin: Sigafridus, Old Norse: Sigurðr, Old English: Sigefrið/Sigeferð) was a missionary-bishop in Scandinavia during the first half of the 11th century. Originally from England, Saint Sigfrid is credited in late medieval king-lists and hagiography with performing the baptism of the first steadfastly Christian monarch of Sweden, Olof Skötkonung. He most likely arrived in Sweden soon after the year 1000 and conducted extensive missions in Götaland and Svealand. For some years after 1014, following his return to England, Sigfrid was based in Trondheim, Norway. However, his position there became untenable after the defeat of Olaf Haraldsson.

While in Norway, Sigfrid continued to participate in the Christianization of Sweden, to which he devoted the remainder of his life. According to Swedish and Icelandic tradition, he retired to Värend. Sigfrid later died in Växjö on an unknown date within the life-time of Adam of Bremen. Sigfrid's burial-place in Växjö became the centre of a cult. According to a statement by Johannes Vastovius, an antiquarian writing in the 17th century, Sigfrid was canonized by Pope Hadrian IV c. 1158. His feast day is 15 February.

Sigfrid is remembered in the Church of England with a commemoration on 15 February.

== Historical background ==
In the ninth century, Anskar, 'Apostle of the North', had already made a missionary journey to Sweden and found Christians among those in captivity there. Subsequently, archbishops of Hamburg-Bremen, as Anskar's successors, and on the basis of papal documents which are now considered of varying degrees of authenticity, regarded themselves as likewise charged with the evangelization of the Far North. Attempts to bring Christianity to Sweden continued sporadically through the ninth and tenth centuries with a considerable measure of success, as is attested particularly by the archaeology of Västergötland.

At the time, the Swedish Kingdom comprised Svealand in the north and Götaland in the south, in addition to provinces bordering Norway, and various offshore islands including Gotland. For a short period after the Battle of Svolder (1000), the King of Sweden controlled a considerable part of Norway and throughout the period of Sigfrid's missions, control of Skåne was disputed between Sweden and Denmark. However, the Swedish Kingdom, as a whole, long remained a conservative bastion of traditional Nordic polytheism, defending itself against Christian missions by a law forbidding forcible conversion. The destruction of its principal cult-centre of Thor, Wodan, and Fricco in Uppsala was not carried out until late in the eleventh century, and the thorough Christianization of the kingdom had to wait until the twelfth century.

Sigfrid's career, therefore, belonged to a period when neither of these goals had yet been achieved, but his success, fame, and influence on younger missionaries nevertheless sufficed to earn him recognition as the primary 'Apostle of Sweden'. That he also worked in Norway, something not at all evident from his hagiography, is stated as a fact by Adam of Bremen, while an anonymous Historia Norvegie additionally reports that Sigfrid was transported from England to Norway, along with other bishops, by the future King and Saint, Olaf Haraldsson. This probably happened in the autumn of 1014. He visited Bremen on at least two occasions; one dates back to perhaps c. 1015, and the other, more certainly, to c. 1030. On the former occasion he entrusted a protégé called Osmund to the schools of Bremen for his education; on the latter, he brought good news to the Archbishop of Hamburg-Bremen about the success of his most recent missions in Sweden. Two Swedish dioceses, Växjö and Skara, claim St Sigfrid as their founding bishop.

== The problematic character of the evidence for Saint Sigfrid's career ==
Statements about the life of Saint Sigfrid that can be regarded as unimpeachable are hard to discover, either in medieval primary sources or in modern reference books; scholars agree in declaring that very little can safely be said about him. The main difficulty for historians is that none of this pioneering missionary's correspondence has survived and, to our knowledge, none of his colleagues in the Scandinavian mission-field wrote a memoir relating his achievements. While it is well-nigh inconceivable that any important pre-Reformation mission-leader originating from England would have set about his work without papal accreditation, in the case of St. Sigfrid, there are no known records of his dealings with Rome, or with the kings, or archbishops of England. The destruction by fire in 1069 of York Minster's archives has left it impossible to reconstruct in any detail the history of the Scandinavian missions dispatched from England before that date.

== Hagiographical narratives of Sigfrid's work in Sweden ==
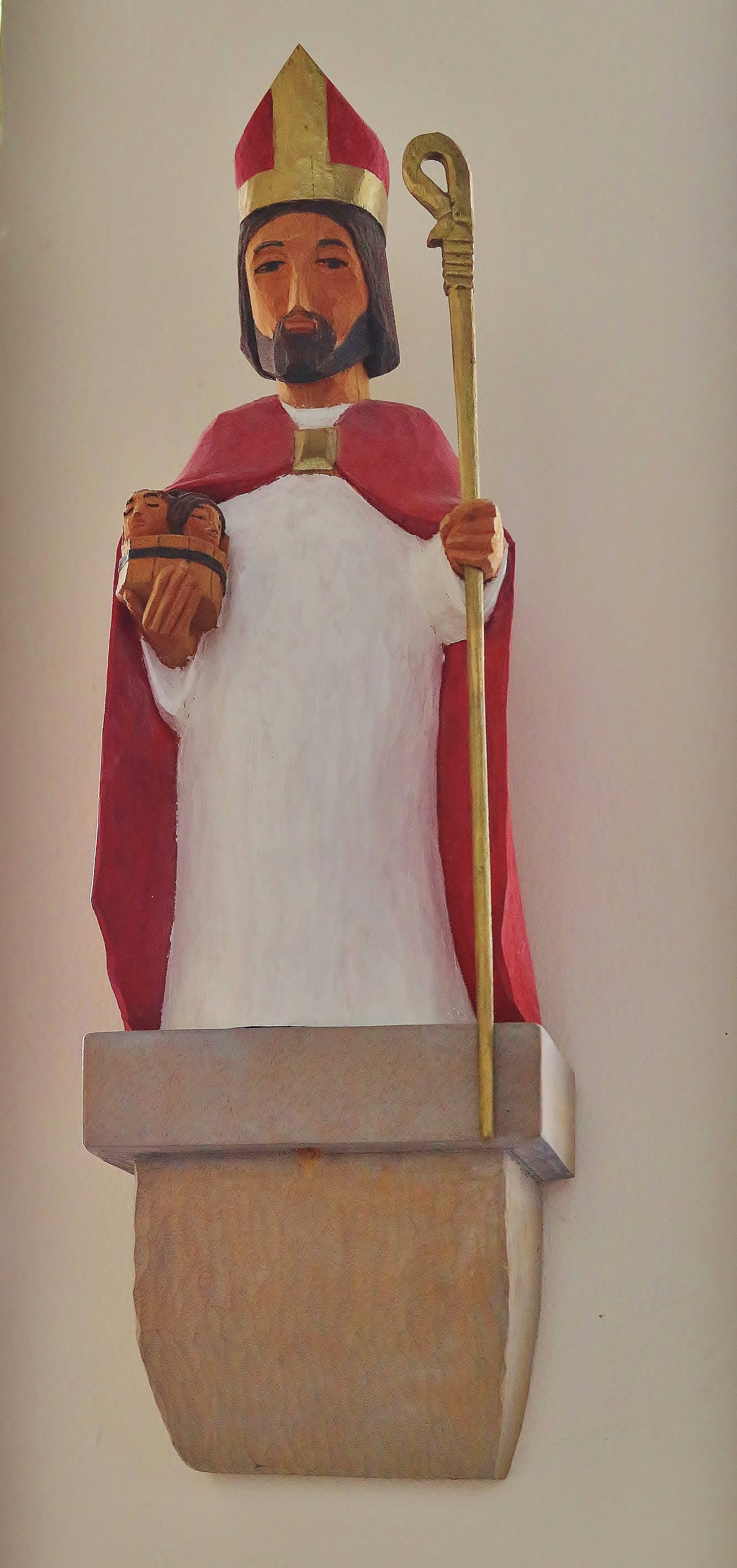
Sigfrid with the heads of his martyred nephews in St Sigfrid's Church, near Nybro

The sources which attest to the activity of Saint Sigfrid—late-medieval Vitae, king-lists of Sweden, and bishop-lists of Swedish dioceses— are generally dismissed today by academic historians both in Sweden and the English-speaking world as of dubious reliability. The two main Latin Vitae open with an episode in which envoys are sent by a king of the Svear (or Götar) called Olavus to a King of England named 'Mildred', entreating him to send Christian missionaries to his country—a request to which Sigfrid, 'Archbishop of York', responds positively. Rather less challenging to modern sceptical attitudes are traditions that, soon after his first arrival in Sweden, Saint Sigfrid was granted land for the church by the newly baptized King Olavus at Husaby (in Västergötland, not far from Skara), and also two more estates, called Hoff and Tiurby, in the vicinity of the future city of Växjö, this time in judicial compensation for the murder of three of his nephews, who had been assisting him in his mission. These are named in the Vitae as Unaman (a priest), Sunaman (a deacon) and Vinaman (a subdeacon). It is reported that their severed heads, deliberately plunged into a lake by the murderers, were miraculously discovered, minus their bodies, by their uncle. Already, before the triple murder, Sigfrid had been instructed by an angel, in a dream, to build a church at the place called Östrabo, later to known as Växjö.

Whereas Sigfrid's earliest days in Sweden are reported by the late-medieval hagiographers in some detail, with extreme specificity as regards names and locations, most of his subsequent long missionary career in the Swedish Kingdom is sketched in the extant Vitae with infuriating vagueness, and with no mention of any journeys and sojourns that he may have made anywhere outside that country after his initial journey there from England via Denmark. Vita I concludes with a report that, much later in his life, he elected to travel to Värend, 'the southernmost district in Götaland', for his retirement, where, as a very old man, he died at Växjö. This tradition is also touched upon in the late-medieval bishop-lists of Skara, and in an Icelandic tale, also late-medieval, about a composite saga-character called Bishop 'Sigurð'. 'Sigurð' appears to be an amalgam between Sigewéard, also known as Johannes, the first of three bishops from England reported by Adam of Bremen to have been based in Trondheim, and the third such bishop, identifiable as our Saint Sigfrid. The Icelandic text adds details about Bishop 'Sigurd's demise in Värend, which might suggest access by its author to richer authentic information about Saint Sigfrid than we possess, but unfortunately, not only is 'Värend' mistaken here for the name of a town, but other narratives by the same author about Bishop 'Sigurd' - his expedition to Jerusalem, and his courageous confrontation with the pagans of Sigtuna - are too novelistic in approach to inspire the trust of cautious scholars.

Vita II asserts that Sigfrid established separate bishoprics for the western and eastern parts of Götaland and also, further north, in Svealand, for Uppsala and Strängnäs. While there is no inherent improbability in the supposition that Saint Sigfrid 'from England' (supposing he been given papal authorization and the standing of a missionary archbishop) might have followed the example of Saints Augustine, Willibrord and Boniface in ordaining bishops for rural regions and population centres within his northern European mission-field, these reports of bishopric-foundation are not usually taken seriously. This is not only because the hagiographical context in which they are presented is easy to dismiss as a tissue of lying tales: the reports themselves appear to conflict with the account of Swedish church-history supplied by Adam of Bremen, a much earlier and seemingly more reliable authority. However, these considerations do not necessarily amount to conclusive disproof.

== Disambiguation ==
For chronological reasons, Saint Sigfrid of Sweden cannot possibly be identifiable with Sigefrid, a monk of Glastonbury whose work as a missionary-bishop to Norway belonged to the days of England's King Edgar (regnal dates 959-975). Despite much confusion generated by Icelandic sources, this Saint Sigfrid also needs to be firmly distinguished from Sigewéard (also known as Johannes), the leading bishop in Olaf Tryggvason's Norway at the end of the tenth century, who seems very probably identifiable with a missionary bishop called 'Siwardus' who retired to the monastery of Ramsey in the abbacy of Eadnoth (993 - c.1008).

On the other hand, it seems safe to identify the Sigfrid of Swedish hagiography and bishop-list traditions with Adam of Bremen's 'Sigafridus', missionary to Sweden as well as Norway. However, it is also possible to identify the apostle to Sweden and 'bishop of the Norwegians', with Sigeferð, bishop of Lindsey, a signatory of certain charters of Æthelred II around the time of the millennium.

In his hagiography, Saint Sigfrid of Sweden is problematically described as having held the office of Archbishop of York. It is possible basis that Sigeferð of Lindsey could have been elected to that office in the late Spring of 1002, following the death of Archbishop Ealdwulf, but because of a call to evangelize Sweden, resigned before enthronement, whereupon Wulfstan, Bishop of London, took his place at York. One seeks in vain for an Archbishop of York signing English royal charters in the summer of 1002. But the possibility that one had been appointed, only to disappear abroad, is certainly not capable of proof. Alternative hypotheses regarding the alleged archiepiscopal rank of Saint Sigfrid can reasonably be mooted, as they have been in the past.

== Adam of Bremen's perspective on the missions to Sweden ==
Adam of Bremen, master of the schools of Bremen in the third and fourth quarter of the 11th century, wrote about missionary activity in Scandinavia in the context of a history of the archbishopric of Hamburg-Bremen, the Gesta Hammaburgensis Ecclesiae Pontificum. Unsurprisingly, he foregrounds the missions dispatched by the archbishops of that province, who regarded themselves as the rightful heirs of St. Anskar, claiming to have been given sole responsibility for the evangelization of the Far North in papal documents of varying degrees of authenticity. According to Adam's account, the only diocese founded in the Swedish Kingdom in the first half of the 11th century was that of Skara, in Götaland, endowed by Olof Skötkonung in his later years, with Thurgot, a nominee of Archbishop Unwan of Hamburg-Bremen, as its first bishop. Not until the 1060s was there to be another attempt by an archbishop of Hamburg-Bremen to found a bishopric in Sweden, this time at Sigtuna in Svealand, and the attempt failed. The reason for this failure was, according to Adam, pagan opposition, and we need not doubt that this was one factor. But another reason could have been the favour with which 'English' missionaries, as distinct from those dispatched from Bremen, had come to be regarded by those in the population of Svealand who had by that date embraced Christianity. The evidence of runic memorial stones datable to the relevant period suggests that such people were already quite numerous.

The date (not supplied by Adam) at which the Diocese of Skara was founded seems to have been c. 1020, if we may judge from traditions about near-contemporary events as recounted in the Saint Olaf Saga of Snorri Sturluson. Bishop Thurgot, after working for an unspecified length of time among the Götar, was, for some unexplained reason, recalled to Bremen, where he took sick and died in c. 1030. The man appointed to succeed him, Gottskalk, Abbot of Ramelsloh, declined ever to leave his north-German monastery for Sweden, and the result was a virtual vacancy-in-see at Skara. This seems to have lasted more than a quarter-century, coming to an end only with Gottskalk's death in c. 1055 and the eventual accession to the see of Bishop Adalward I in c. 1058. As bishop-elect, Adalward, formerly Dean of Bremen, first had to oust Osmund, court-bishop to Emund, king of Sweden, who was discovered behaving as if he were that country's archbishop. At first, furthermore, Osmund was successful in asserting that he had a better claim to ecclesiastical primacy in Sweden than Adalward, who had only Hamburg-Bremen's authorization for his mission, not that of Rome.

Bishop Osmund is known, from Adam's account, to have been educated at the schools of Bremen under the sponsorship of Sigafridus, bishop of the Norwegians, presumably, the same third bishop in Trondheim who was known also for his missions to Sweden. It is reasonable to surmise from this incident that this Bishop Sigfrid, though from England, was disposed to cultivate a good diplomatic relationship with the Hamburg-Bremen archbishopric. Another testimony of his courtesy in relation to the authorities in Bremen is the fact that he was on a visit there, reporting on his successes in Sweden, at the time of Thurgot's death and funeral. But plainly he was not an appointee of an archbishop of Hamburg-Bremen. Nor was his protégé and apparent successor, Osmund, who, by claiming papal authorization for his assuming of an archiepiscopal role in Sweden in the mid-1050s, incurred charges of insubordination and ingratitude towards the archdiocese which had provided him with his education.

Adam, the historian of that archdiocese, was broad-minded enough to acknowledge on many occasions the important part played by missionaries dispatched from places other than Bremen in the evangelization of the Far North. He vouches specifically for the fame of Sigfrid. But his information about the processes whereby Norway and Sweden were evangelized was impressionistic, patchy, and sometimes out of date, having been obtained at second-hand from well-travelled visitors to Bremen, rather than from personal travel and fact-finding.

His most distinguished informant was Svein Estrithsen, King of Denmark, who had spent his soldiering days in the service of Anund Jakob, son and heir of Olof Skötkonung. Svein Estrithsen had great respect for the missionaries working among the 'barbarians' in the remoter parts of the area which the Hamburg-Bremen archbishopric considered its province, pointing out once to Archbishop Adalbert that they had a distinct advantage over clergy from Bremen, in coming from a cultural background which gave them an affinity and a shared language with their prospective converts. Anglo-Scandinavians would have been among the people he had in mind, along with Christians actually of Danish, Norwegian or Swedish nationality. The general impression Adam had gained, most likely from Svein Estrithsen, was that 'among the Norwegians and Swedes, because the planting of Christianity is something new, no dioceses with fixed boundaries have so far been designated, but all of the bishops chosen by a king or the populace combine to build a church and, traveling around a region, draw as many people as they can to Christianity and govern them without rancour as long as they live'. Adam thus stresses the mobility and adaptability of the missionaries, whose leader Saint Sigfrid seems to have been, and the collaborative nature of their enterprises. He mentions no particular names of places in Sweden where bishops were installed in churches by common consent. But that is not to say that Sigfrid might not have initiated the building of churches at Uppsala and Strängnäs, which were from the beginning envisaged as at least potential cathedrals of those cities and the countryside surrounding them—or that he may not have, from the outset, envisaged the newly acquired Church properties at Husaby and in the district of Värend as headquarters for two distinct missions aimed at the two main sectors into which Götaland was divided. The question of whether the reports of bishopric-foundation in Vita Sigfridi II had a factual basis is ripe for re-examination.

== The sequence of events in Saint Sigfrid's missionary career: an attempt at reconstruction ==
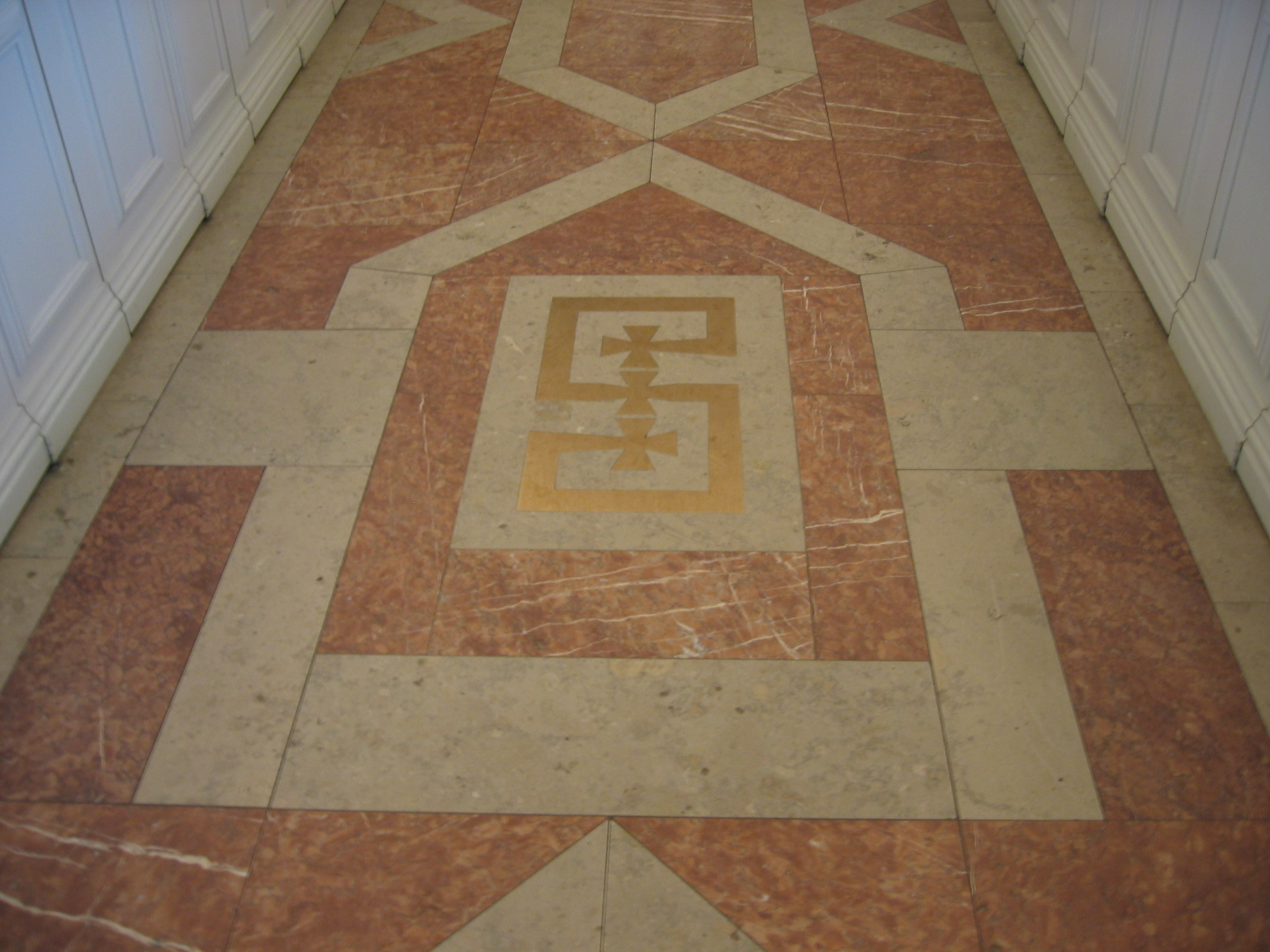
Stone marker in the crossing in Växjö Cathedral, marking what may be the burial place of Sigfrid

Medieval primary sources are unanimous in stating that Saint Sigfrid came from England (Latin: Anglia), "Anglia" being a geographical term which, for Adam of Bremen, meant the whole of the large island known to the Romans as Britannia, distinct from Ireland (Hibernia) 'to the left of it'. No information is given in any extant pre-modern text as to Sigfrid's exact place of birth within England, or about any attachment he may have had to a monastic community, English or continental.

The hagiographical traditions about Saint Sigfrid's first arrival in the Swedish Kingdom presuppose a political background in which a king called Olavus, desirous of his country's adoption of Christianity, was ruling in a kingdom which included both Svealand and Götaland. At the same time, England and Denmark were being ruled by two separate kings, not by one, as was the case during the ascendency of Cnut, who ultimately gained control of Norway as well as England and Denmark. The scenario evoked in the problematic opening episodes of Saint Sigfrid's Lives is thus suggestive of the situation, immediately after the Battle of Svolder in the year 1000, when Æthelred II was king of England, while the Danish king, Svein Forkbeard, and his Swedish counterpart, Olof Eriksson Skötkonung, had recently made a pact agreeing to promote Christianity in their respective realms and spread it abroad. A date early in the first decade of the new millennium may, therefore, be hypothetically suggested for St Sigfrid's first arrival in Sweden and the beginning of his missionary activities there.

Material evidence of Anglo-Saxon Christian influence on Olof Skötkonung from the beginning of his reign in c. 995 may be found in his coinage. The spread of the fashion for (mainly Christian) rune-stones northward from Denmark provides evidence of intensive missionary activity, particularly in Götaland in the first quarter of the eleventh century. This is a period to which the earliest of the liturgical manuscript fragments of English origin found in Sweden may also belong, though there is much dispute about the dating of particular examples.

Sigfrid's main sojourn in Norway evidently belonged to the years of the ascendancy of Olaf Haraldsson, who seized the throne there in 1015. According to an anonymous Historia Norvegie, Sigfrid was the name of one of the four bishops transported across the North Sea from England to Norway by this nautical war-lord, probably in the autumn of 1014, following an episode when he had helped restore Æthelred II to the throne of England. It is hence likely that, in Snorri Sturluson's saga-narratives, the activities credited to the bishop 'Sigurd' in the reign of Olaf Haraldsson (Saint Olaf), reflect actual events in the Norwegian ministry of Saint Sigfrid, whereas those attributed to an identically named bishop in the saga of Olaf Tryggvason reflect the achievements of an earlier English bishop, Sigewéard, otherwise known as Johannes.

Sigfrid was a 'bishop of the Norwegians' at the time when he entrusted the future bishop Osmund to the schools of Bremen. A birth-date for Osmund of c. 1000 is suggested by the fact that he seemed 'old' to the monks of Ely, when he spent his retirement in their company for a period between the years 1057 and 1072. Perhaps Sigfrid had brought the young Osmund over the North Sea from England with him late in 1014 and took him to Bremen in the following year. But other sequences of events, and hence different chronologies are possible to envisage.

Royal displeasure on the part of Olof Skötkonung is the most likely explanation for Sigfrid's departure from the Swedish Kingdom back to England and then to Norway. Certainly, in c. 1020, when that king, on retirement to Götaland, decided upon the foundation of a new bishopric based at Skara, it was to Bremen that he looked for a bishop, rather than to England. But the death of Olof Skötkonung, soon enough followed by the recall of Thurgot, Bishop of Skara, to Bremen, altered the church-political situation in Sweden in ways which could have encouraged Sigfrid, as early as the mid-1020s, to base himself once more exclusively in his old mission field.

The last appearance in Norway of Bishop 'Sigurð' in Snorri's Óláfs saga Helga, chapter 120, is implicitly dated to the tenth year of the reign of Olaf Haraldsson of Norway (1025); the death of Olof, King of Sweden, is reported, in chapter 114, as having happened earlier than this. We need not assume that Sigfrid's appointment as the third bishop to be based in Trondheim tied him exclusively to Norway: it is credible that all along he was at liberty to make visits to his colleagues working on the other side of the Norwegian-Swedish border—given that Olaf Haraldsson is said to have encouraged the bishops whom he ferried across the North Sea to travel on to 'Svealand, Götaland, and all the islands beyond Norway.' Adam of Bremen specifically states that Bishop Sigfrid preached to both the Swedes and the Norwegians 'side by side' (Latin 'iuxta'). The journey from one mission-field to the other, though arduous if undertaken overland, would have been tolerably easy by ship. So, possibly, Sigfrid was still based in Norway at the time of Olaf Haraldsson's defeat by Cnut of Denmark and Anund Jakob of Sweden at the battle of the Holy River (1027). But after that, Cnut's takeover of power in Norway was followed by a radical change in church leadership which would have made Sigfrid's previous position in Trondheim untenable. By c. 1030, he could look back on great successes specifically in his Swedish mission-field, which he was able to report to Archbishop Libentius when—in company with two fellow-bishops, Odinkar the Younger from Denmark and Rodolf from Norway—he made a courteous visit to Bremen at the time of Bishop Thurgot's funeral.

Sigfrid's movements after that visit are unrecorded, apart from his eventual move to Värend. Of the period prior to his retirement, Vita I merely tells us that: 'He traversed all parts of Sweden, preaching, baptizing and converting the people to the faith of Christ, and he also urged those who he had imbued with the faith by holy admonitions that they should persevere, for they would receive eternal rewards from God. In particular, he constructed churches, ordained clerics and gave them orders to gain people for the Lord by preaching and baptizing.'

By 1030, Sigfrid may well already have reached an age appropriate for retirement from a life of such demanding activity. However, the refusal of Bishop-elect Gottskalk to take up residence in Götaland brought about a prolonged crisis of leadership in the newly founded diocese of Skara, and there is some evidence that Sigfrid, presumably basing himself at Husaby, was the first to step into the breach.

In the late-medieval bishop-lists of Skara, 'Saint' Sigfrid 'from England', is commemorated as the first bishop of the diocese - with no mention of Thurgot, let alone Gottskalk. Sigfrid is also credited with having demarcated churchyards for three adjacent tiny villages in Västergötland: Friggeråker, (Östra) Gerum and Agnestad. This incident is unlikely to have happened before Christianization in the vicinity of Skara had reached an advanced stage, probably in the 1020s or early 1030s. By that time, rune-specialists believe that in Västergötland, though not yet further north in the Swedish Kingdom, the older custom of erecting wayside runic memorials to the dead had largely been abandoned in favour of churchyard burials. This episode about the three village churchyards sounds like a piece of short-term deputization for an absent bishop. Following this incident, so tradition says, Sigfrid went on his way to Värend. Maybe it was remembered at Skara because it was his last action in Västergötland.

It is implied, later in the bishop-list, that Sigfrid never actually 'sat' as bishop at Skara. Not until a somewhat later stage in the 'vacancy in see' crisis did Bishop Osmund, presumably Sigfrid's protégé, venture to do this, after being granted a residence on former common-land adjacent to that of the Dean, presumably with the consent of the local populace and the Cathedral Chapter. From an anglophile point of view expressed in Vita Sigfridi II, this move constituted transference of the Bishop's see, after a long elapse of time, from Husaby to Skara.

To the information conveyed by Sigefrid's Vita I, that he died and was buried in Växjö, the late-medieval author of Óláfs saga Tryggvasonar en mesta adds an anecdote about Bishop 'Sigurd', set in 'a town called Värend'. This story alleges that the bishop had become slightly forgetful about the niceties of Church discipline before his death in extreme old age. But, while it is doubtless the case that fuller accounts of the life of St Sigfrid were in circulation in the pre-Reformation era than now, a warning has already been given against trusting the reportage of this particular Icelandic author.

No primary source gives any precise date for Sigfrid's demise. The only reasonably safe chronological finding deducible from extant evidence is that Sigfrid lived on at or near Växjö in retirement for a considerable number of years after his attendance, in c.1030, at the funeral in Bremen of Bishop Thurgot.

== Successors ==
With regard to Trondheim, Adam of Bremen names Tholf and Siwardus, both Hamburg-Bremen appointees, as the successors to the earliest three bishops, all of whom had come 'from England'. 'Tholf' may have been Throlf (Thorulf), a bishop who, according to Adam, was put in charge of the Orkney Islands (a day's sea-journey from Trondheim), while 'Siwardus' seems identifiable with the Danish Bishop 'Sigurð', who, according to Snorri, was appointed by Cnut as court-bishop to the jarl who became his first regent in Norway, but became so unpopular for his disparagement of Olaf Haraldsson that he left Norway, whereupon Grimkel, Sigfrid's predecessor in Trondheim, was recalled from a mission in the mountains to replace him.

That Sigfrid continued, even in his retirement, to be a director of Christian mission in Sweden, advising younger clergy in their choices of mission field, is the implication of hagiographical traditions linking him with Saint Eskil of Strängnäs and Saint David of Västerås. These two saints were prominent among the missionaries of English origin who carried on Sigfrid's work in Svealand in the period which followed the expulsion of Bishop Osmund (most probably in 1057) and the subsequent failure in c. 1060 of Archbishop Adalbert's attempt to set up a new diocesan see at Sigtuna. As for Götaland: several of the eleventh-century bishops in the succession-list of bishops of Skara are stated to have been from England, though others were definitely not.

Problematically, the bishop-lists of Skara state that Sigfrid's immediate successor in Västergötland was 'Archbishop Unni' or 'Saint Unno', specifying that he was an Englishman who was martyred by stoning. Critical scholars have to decide whether he should be presumed to be a genuine historical figure of some importance or a fictional doublet of a tenth-century Archbishop of Hamburg-Bremen, who died in Sweden. Osmund is said to have succeeded him. In the Växjö bishop-list, Osmund is named as Sigfrid's immediate successor, but the list suffers from an evident lacuna, skipping as it does from the 'first' to the 'third' of Sigfrid's successors. It could be that, here too, the name of 'Unni'/'Unno' once appeared before that of Osmund, but was deleted by someone who thought him fictional.

The issue of the conflict of ecclesiastical interests between Hamburg-Bremen and England with regard to Sweden, which the success of Saint Sigfrid's had precipitated, was not finally settled until the twelfth century, when new archbishoprics were established within Scandinavia itself, successively at Lund (1104), Trondheim (1152) and Uppsala (1162). As Papal Legate to Scandinavia in 1150, Nicholas Breakspear, the future Pope Hadrian IV, was prominent in furthering the latter part of the process that led to the eventual settlement.

== Bibliography ==
- Åberg, Göran (2013), Växjö Diocese: past and present, (Växjö Stiftshistoriska Sallskap, Skrifter 20, Växjö).
- Abrams, Lesley (1995), 'The Anglo-Saxons and the Christianization of Scandinavia', Anglo-Saxon England 24, pp. 213–49.
- Adam of Bremen, Gesta Hammaburgensis Ecclesie Pontificum: Latin text in Schmeidler (1917); Latin text and German translation in Trillmich 1961; English translation in Tschan 2002.
- Beauchet, Ludovic (1894), Loi de Vestrogothie (Westgöta-lagen) traduite et annotée et precedée d'une étude sur les sources du droit Suédois (Paris).
- Berend, Nora, ed. (2007), Christianization and the Rise of Christian Monarchy: Scandinavia, Central Europe and Rus' (Cambridge).
- Bishop-lists of Skara = Chronicon Vetus Episcoporum Scarensium and Chronicum Rhythmicum Episcoporum Scarensium auctore Brynolpho . . . Episcopo Scarensi in Scriptores Rerum Suecicarum Medii Aevi, vol. III, part ii, pp. 112–120; for English translations of the earliest entries in these lists by Bishop Lars-Göran Lonnermark, see Fairweather 2014, pp. 210–11; 283; 286; 301.
- Bishop-list of Växjö: Chronicon Vetus Episcoporum Wexionensium in Scriptores Rerum Suecicarum Medii Aevi, vol. III, part ii, pp. 129–32.
- Brunius, Jan (2005) ed. Medieval Book Fragments in Sweden: an international seminar in Stockholm, 13–16 November 2003 (Stockholm)
- Brunius Jan (2013) From Manuscripts to Wrappers: Medieval Book Fragments in the Swedish National Archive (Skrifter utgivna ac Riksarkivet 33: Stockholm)
- Campbell, Alistair (1949) reprinted in Campbell, Alisdair & Keynes, Simon, Encomium Emmae Reginae, (Camden Classic Reprints 4, Cambridge 1998), pp. 66–82.
- Carver, Martin ed. (2003), The Cross Goes North: Processes of Conversion in Northern Europe, A.D. 300-1300 (York & Woodbridge).
- Curshmann, Fritz (1909), Älteren Papsturkunden des Erzbistums Hamburg (Hamburg & Leipzig).
- Dunn-Macray, W (1886) ed. Chronicon Rameseiensis, a saec. X usque ad an. circiter 1200, (Rolls Series LXXXIII, London)
- Ekrem, Inger, Mortensen Lars-Boje & Fisher, Peter ed. & trans. (2003), Historia Norvegie (Copenhagen)
- Fairweather, Janet (2014), Bishop Osmund, A Missionary to Sweden in the Late Viking Age (Skara Stiftshistoriska Sällskaps Skriftserie, volume 71, Skara).
- Flateyjarbók, eds. G, Vigfusson & C.R. Unger (Christiania 1859-68).
- Gneuss, Helmut (2001), Handlist of Anglo-Saxon Manuscripts: a list of manuscripts and manuscript fragments written or owned in England up to 1100
- Goscelini Miracula Sancti Ivonis in Dunn Macray 1886 (Appendix II to Preface)
- Hagiography of St Sigfrid = Historia Sancti Sigfridi Episcopi et Confessoris Latine et Suethice (= Vita I) and Vita Sancti Sigfridi Episcopi et Confessoris ( = Vita II) in Scriptores Rerum Suecicarum Medii Aevi, vol II, part 1, pp. 344–370 + the texts printed in Schmid 1942.
- Halldorsson, Ólafur ed. (1958-2000) Oláfs saga Tryggvasonar en mesta, ed. (3 vols. København)
- Hartzell, K.D (2006) Catalogue of Manuscripts written or owned in England up to 1200 containing music (Woodbridge).
- Hervarar saga: see Tolkien
- Historia Norvegie: Latin text in Monumenta Historica Norvegiae (1880), pp. 69–124; text and English translation in Ekrem, Mortensen & Fisher 2003.
- Johansson, Hilding (1986) 'Skara som stiftstad', in Sträng 1986, pp. 387–410.
- King-lists of Sweden: Scriptores Rerum Suecicarum Medii Aevi vol. I, pp. 1–15
- Kjöllerström, Sven (1979) Sankt Sigfrid, Sigfridslegenden och Växjö Stift (Lecture given at the Kyrkohistoriska föreningens ärsmöte, Uppsala, April 1979 and at the 500th anniversary of the University of Copenhagen, May 1979.
- Knibbs (2011), Anskar, Rimbert and the Forged Foundations of Hamburg-Bremen (Farnham)
- Liber Eliensis: Latin text ed. E.O. Blake 1962 (Royal Historical Society: Camden third series, volume 92, London); English translation by Janet Fairweather 2005, Liber Eliensis: a History of the Isle of Ely from the seventh century to the twelfth (Woodbridge).
- Lager, Linn (2003), 'Runestones and the Conversion of Sweden' in Carver 2003, pp. 497–507.
- Larsson Lars-Olof (1931), Det medeltida Värend (Diss. Lund).
- Malmer, Brita (1989), The Sigtuna Coinage c. 995-1005 (Commentationes de nummis saeculorum IX-XI in Suecia repertis, nova series 4, Stockholm & London.
- Malmer, Brita 1997, The Anglo-Scandinavian Coinage, c. 995-1026 (Commentationes de nummis saeculorum IX-XI repertis, nova series 9 (Stockholm & London)
- Monumenta Historica Norvegiae: Latinske kildeskrifter til Norges historie in Middelaldern ed. G. Strom (Kristiania 1880)
- Niblaeus, Erik G. (2010) German Influence on religious practice in Scandinavia c. 1050 - 1150, King's College, London, diss.
- Norton, Christopher (2004), 'York Minster in the time of Wulfstan', in Townend 2004, pp. 207–34.
- Oláfs saga Tryggvasonar en mesta: 'Frá Sigurði Byskupi; Her (s(egir) af framferd Sigurdar byskups; Kapitulum': printed in Halldorsson vol III (2000) pp. 57–64; also cited in secondary sources as from Flateyjarbók.
- Oppermann, C.J.A. (1937), The English Missionaries in Sweden and Finland (London)
- Raine, James ed. (1874–94), Historians of the Church of York and its Archbishops (Rolls Series, vols. LXXI – LXXII London).
- Rimbert, Vita Sancti Anskarii, Latin text in Waitz 1884 and Trillmich 1961 (with German translation; English translation in Robinson 1921.
- Robinson, Charles H (1921), Anskar, the Apostle to the North, 801-65, translated from the Vita Anskarii by Bishop Rimbert (London)
- Sawyer, Birgit (2000), The Viking Age Rune-Stones: Custom and Commemoration in Early Medieval Scandinavia (Oxford).
- Sawyer, Birgit and Sawyer, Peter (1993) Medieval Scandinavia: from Conversion to Reformation, circa 800-1500 (Minneapolis & London)
- Sawyer, Birgit, Sawyer, Peter & Wood, Ian (1987), The Christianization of Scandinavia: Report of a Symposium held at Kungalv, Sweden, 4–9 August 1985 (Alingsås)
- Sawyer, Peter, The Making of Sweden (1988: Occasional Papers on Medieval Topics 3 - Viktoria Bokforlag, Alingsås, in cooperation with the Department of History, Gothenburg University)
- Scriptores Rerum Suecicarum Medii Aevi (Uppsala 1818-1876):
  - vol. I, ed. E.M. Fant (1818)
  - vol. II ed. E.J. Geijer & J.H. Schröder (1828)
  - vol. III. ed. E. Annerstadt (1871–76)
- Schmeidler, Bernhard (1917) ed. Adam Bremensis, Gesta Hammaburgensis Ecclesie Pontificum (MGH SRG vol. 2, 3rd edition).
- Schmid, Toni (1931) Den Helige Sigfrid (Lund)
- Schmid, Toni (1942) 'Trois légendes de Saint Sigfrid', Analecta Bollandiana 60, pp. 82–90.
- Scott, John (1981) ed. & trans.William of Malmesbury, De antiquitate Glastoniensis ecclesiae (Woodbridge).
- Snorri Sturluson, Óláfs saga Helga, from Heimskringla ed. Aðalbjarnarson 1941-51; English translations in Monson, E. & Smith. A.H. (Cambridge 1932); Hollander. Lee M. (Austin, Texas 1964).
- Sträng, Arne (1986), Skara: Före 1700, Staden i Stiftet (Skara).
- Talbot, C.H. (1954), The Anglo-Saxon Missionaries in Germany (London).
- Tolkien, Christopher (1960), Hervarar saga och Heidreks konungs: the Saga of King Heidrek the Wise, translated from the Icelandic with introduction, notes, and appendices (London).
- Townend, Matthew (2004) ed. Wulfstan, Archbishop of York (Proceedings of the Second Alcuin Conference: Studies in the Early Middle Ages 10: York)
- Trillmich W. (1961) ed. Quellen des 9. und 11. Jahrhunderts zur Geschichte der Hamburgischen Kirche und des Reiches (Darmstadt).
- Tschan F. (2002), trans. History of the Archbishops of Hamburg-Bremen, with introduction and bibliography by Timothy Reuter (New York).
- Vastovius, Ioannes (1623), Vitis Aquilonia (Cologne, 2nd edition, corrected and annotated by Erik Benzelius, Uppsala 1708).
- Vretemark, Maria and Axelsson, Tony (2008), 'The Varnhem Archaeological Research Project - a new insight into the Christianisation of Västergötland', Viking and Medieval Scandinavia 4, pp. 209 – 219.
- Waitz, G (1884), Vita Anskarii auctore Rimberto: accedit Vita Rimberti (MGH SRG, vol. LV: Hannover).
- William of Malmesbury, see Scott 1981.
- Wordsworth, John, Bishop of Salisbury (1911), The National Church of Sweden (London, Oxford, Milwaukee)
