= Villa Lusthusporten =

Building in Stockholm, Sweden

Coordinates: 59°19′43.25″N 18°5′51.18″E

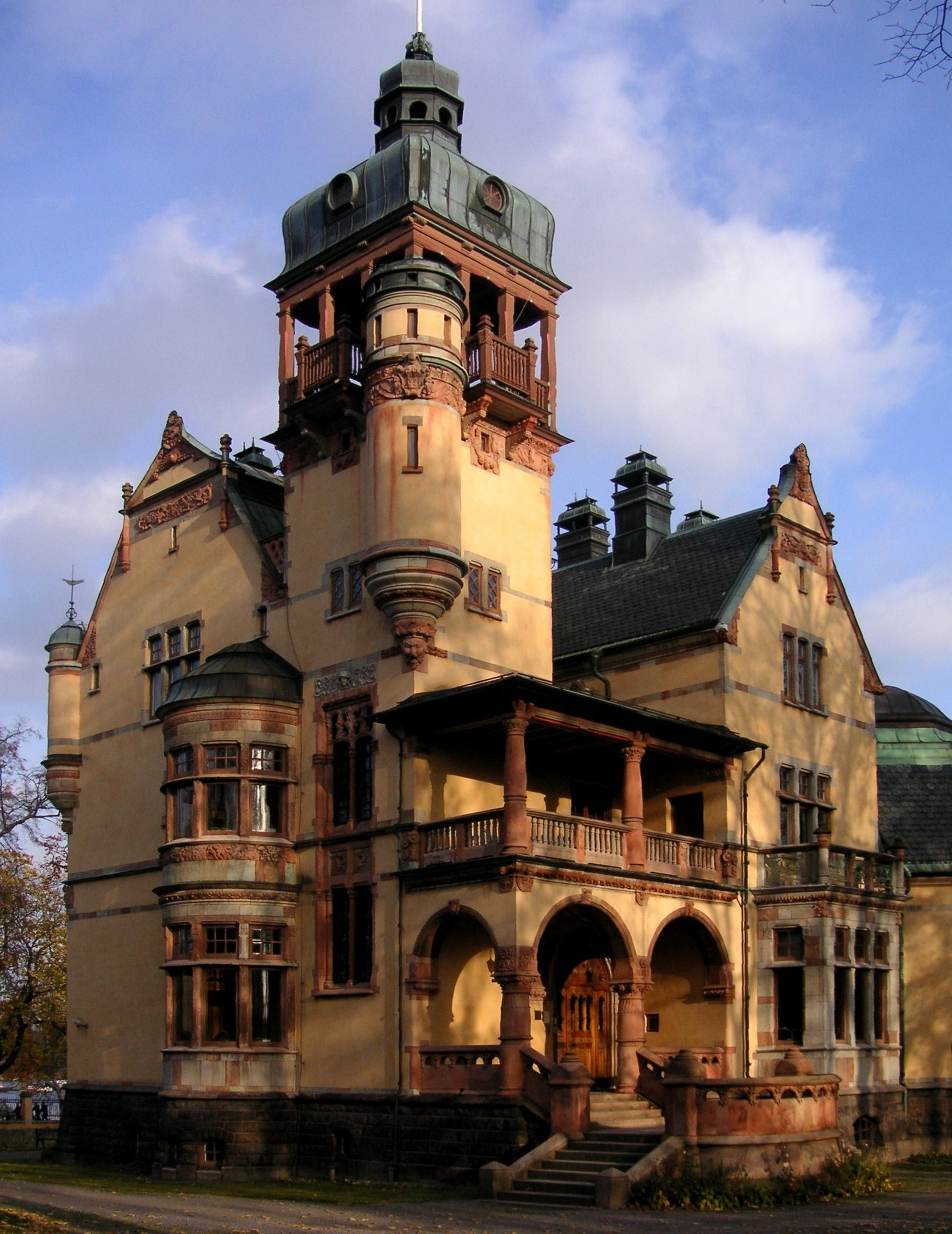
Villa Lusthusporten in 2007

Villa Lusthusporten, also called villa Wicanderska, villa Brinckska, and villa Liljevalchska, is a 19th-century merchant's house on Djurgården road, north of Djurgården, in Stockholm.

== History ==
Djurgården was originally an enclosed hunting area with entrances through multiple gates. In 1600 there was a gazebo which gave its name to the nearby gateway. There was also an inn named 'Lusthusporten', but it was burned down in the 1869. In 1873 the trader Brink leased the land to architects Axel and Hjalmar Kumlien who built then a house on the site.

The small house was built in Italian style, forming the backbone of the existing house. During the great General Art and Industrial Exposition of Stockholm (1897), the villa was temporarily used as press office and police station.

The building was sold to the cork magnate Hjalmar Wicander in 1898 and he commissioned architect Carl Möller to remodel the house to its present appearance of a Baroque Revival architecture with Art Nouveau decor considered fashion at the time. Later the site was reduced in favor of a public promenade and the villa fenced with an iron railing.

=== Museum ===
In 1940 Villa Lusthusporten was donated to the Nordic Museum Foundation when the Institute of Ethnology was established. The building is now a national monument.

== See also ==
- Architecture of Stockholm
