= Helgasjön =

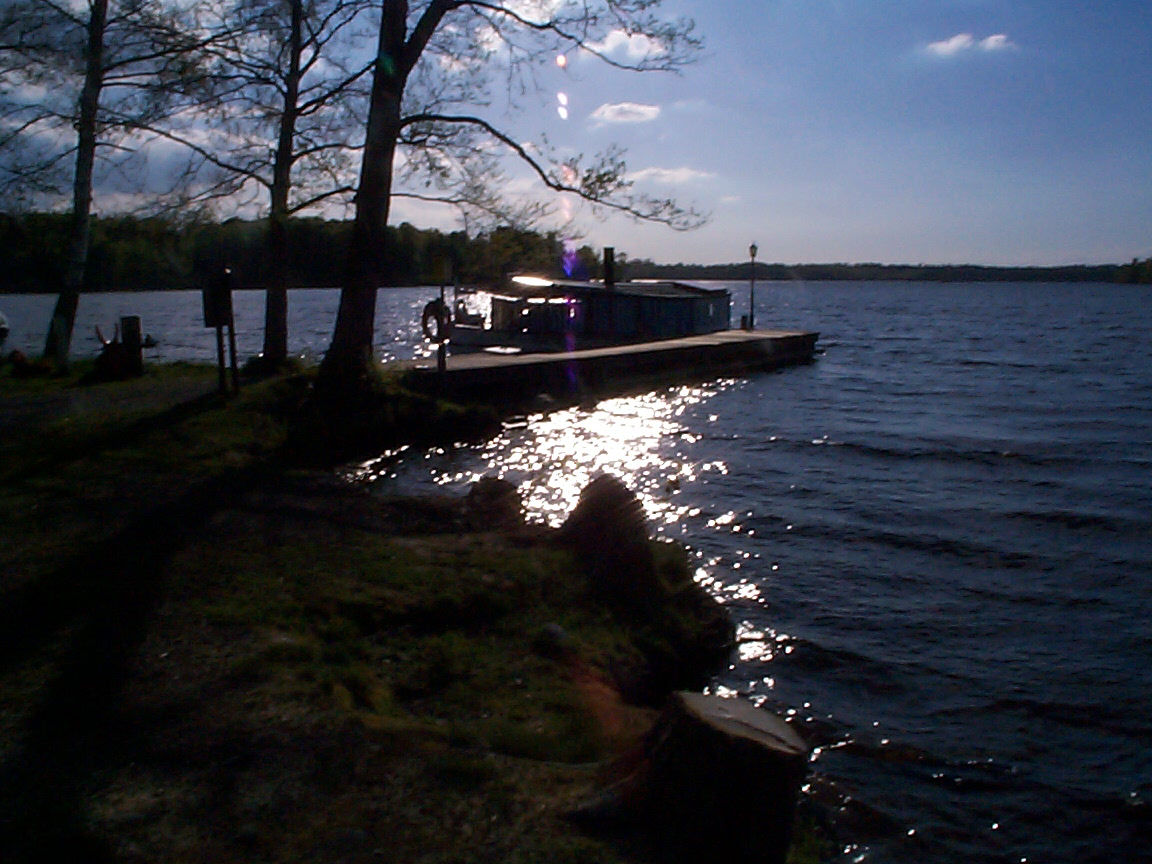
- Lake Helgasjön close to Växjö

- Location within Kronoberg Location within Sweden
- Location: Växjö Municipality in Kronobergs län in southern Småland, Sweden
- Coordinates: 56°57′59.07″N 14°46′5.52″E
- Type: lake
- Surface area: 50 square kilometres (19 sq mi)
- Surface elevation: 162 metres (531 ft)

Helgasjön (Swedish pronunciation: [ˈhɛ̂ljaˌɧœn]) is a lake in Växjö Municipality, Kronobergs län in southern Småland.

The lake is situated 162 metres (531 ft) above sea level. Its area is 50 square kilometres (19 sq mi). Kronoberg Castle is situated by the lake.
