= Kronoberg Castle =

Swedish ruined castle

Coordinates: 56°56′25″N 14°47′42″E

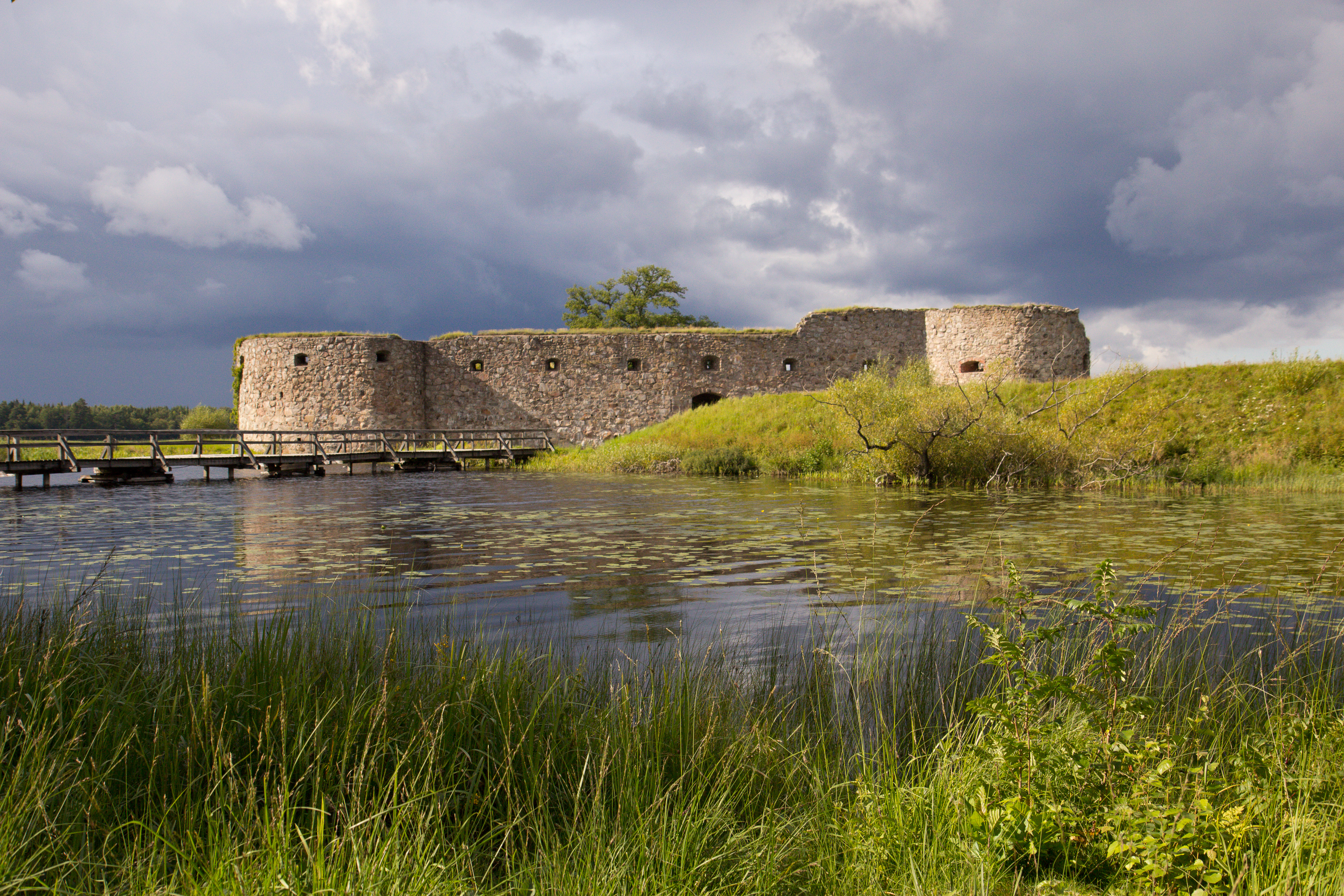
Kronoberg Castle ruins with forecourt island

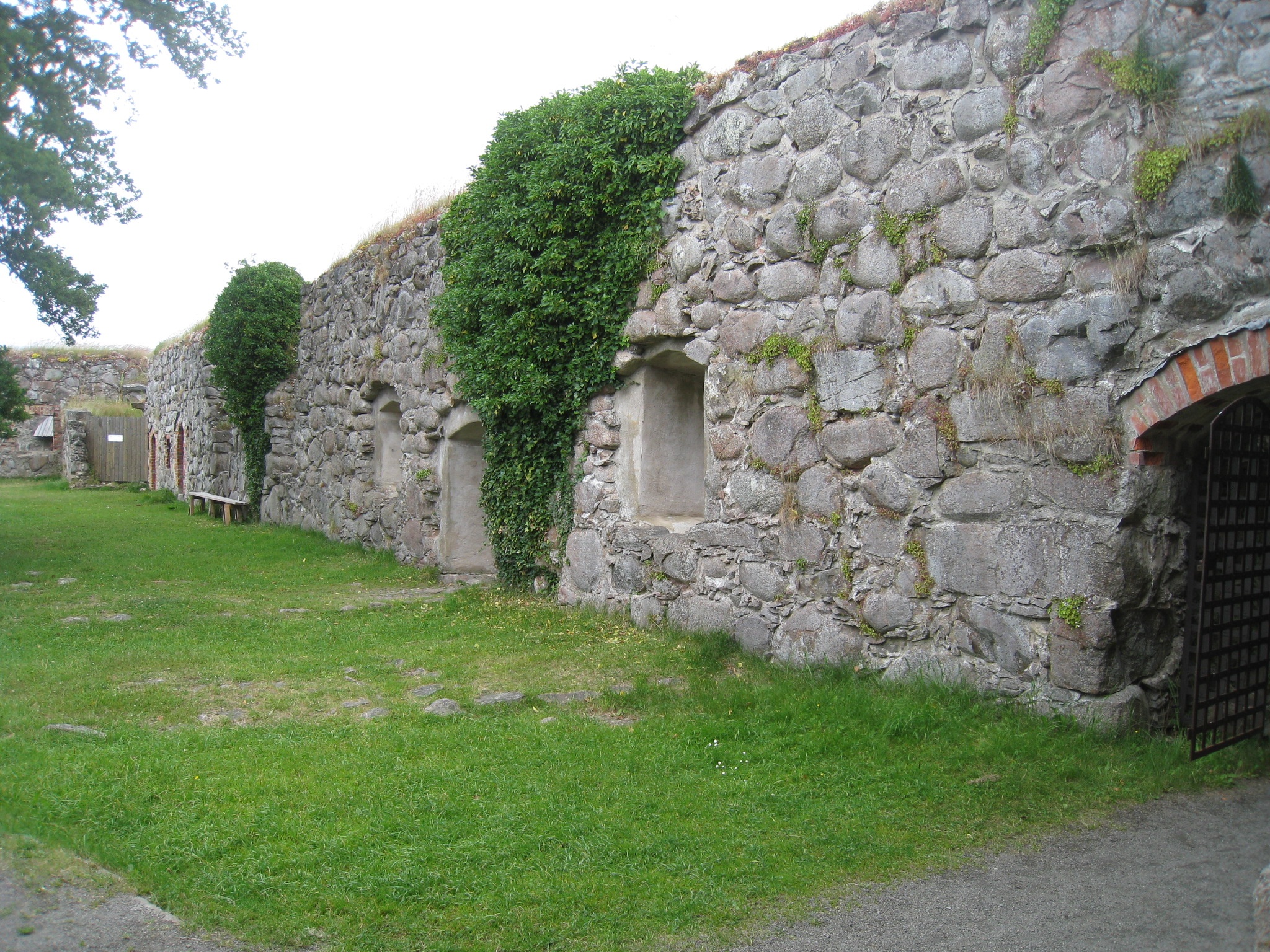
Kronoberg Castle ruins

Kronoberg Castle (Swedish: Kronobergs slott) is a medieval ruined castle (slottsruin) located on an island in Helgasjön ("the Helga Lake"), 5 kilometres (3.1 mi) north of Växjö in Kronoberg County, which is named after the castle. The castle ruin used to be open to tourists in the summer months, but is permanently closed to tourists since January 2023 due to lack of maintenance.

== History ==
In 1444 Lars Mikaelson, Bishop of Växjö, built a stone building on the lakeshore, which was destroyed by Danish forces during the Dano-Swedish War (1470–71), but reconstructed and fortified after restored peace in 1472. During the Reformation in Sweden, the castle and its estate were confiscated by King Gustav I.

In 1542, during the Dacke War (Dackefejden) Kronoberg was taken over by rebels led by Nils Dacke. The revolt was suppressed in 1543, and control reverted to the crown. Due to its strategic location near the border between Sweden and Denmark at the time, the castle was further fortified and became a stronghold in this part of Småland.

The king's son John III ordered additional improvements that never were carried out. The castle had great military significance during the Northern Seven Years' War (1564–70). In the winter of 1568, Eric XIV used Kronoborg as a support point while beating back a Danish attack from Skåne. In 1570 the castle was successfully besieged and burned by the Danes. Between 1576 and 1580 construction continued, after which the castle had at least 50 cannons. Duke Charles continued work on the fortifications, but in the end of January 1612, the castle was again taken and burned by Danish troops under Breide Rantzau (1556–1618).Reconstruction was not started until 1616.

As late as the reign of King Charles XI, Kronoberg castle was in good condition. However, after the Treaty of Roskilde was signed in 1658, the Swedish-Danish border was moved to Øresund, and Kronoberg castle lost its military significance. Neglected, the building began to decay and became a ruin.

== Other sources ==
- Ekstedt, Olle (2009) Kronoberg och Evedal genom tiderna (Rottne: Vinga) ISBN 978-91-87240-97-3
