= Växjö =

City in Småland, Sweden

- City
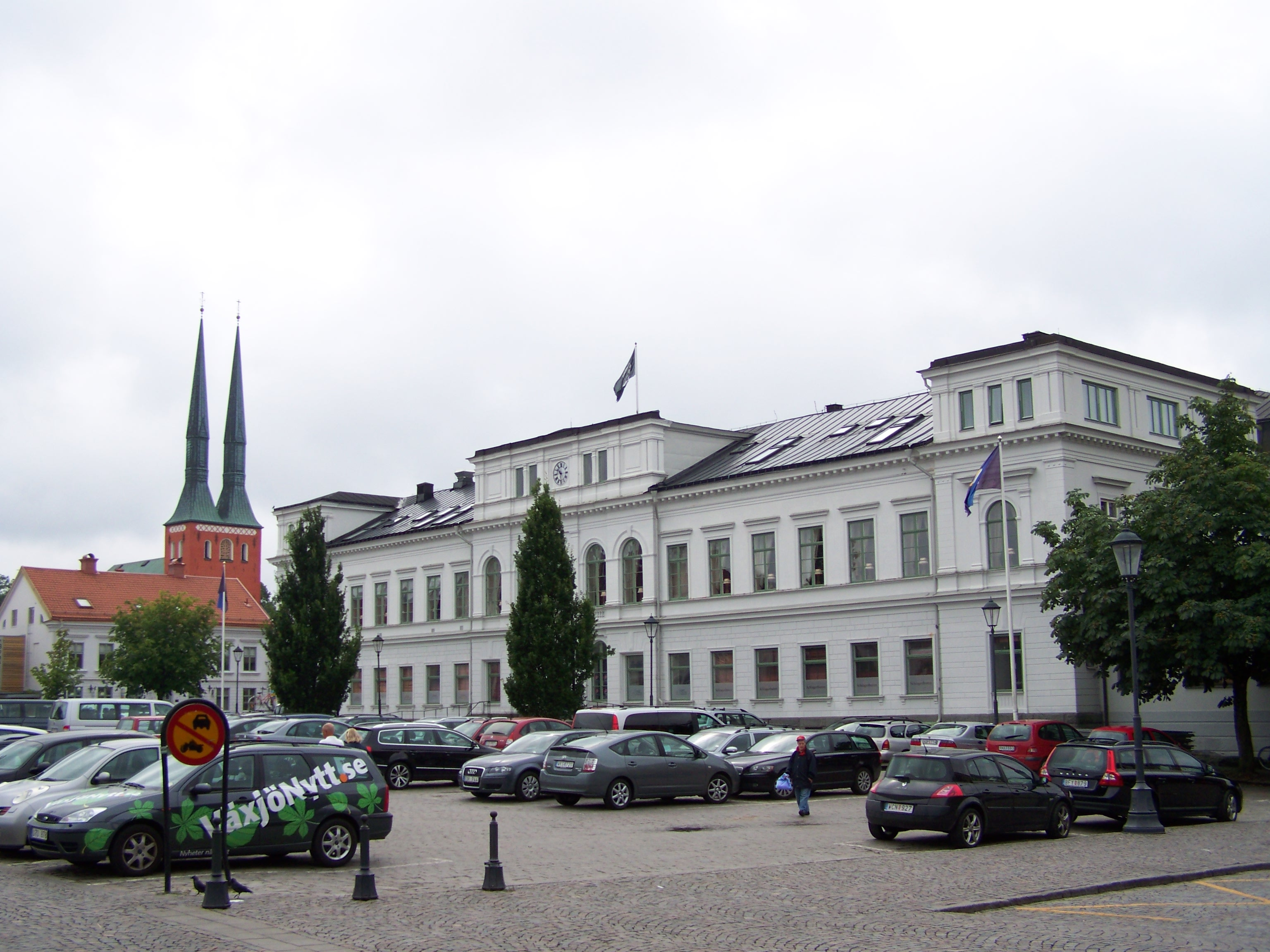

- Coat of arms
- Motto: Europe's Greenest City
- Location within Kronoberg Location within Sweden
- Coordinates: 56°52′37″N 14°48′33″E
- Country: Sweden
- Province: Småland
- County: Kronoberg County
- Municipality: Växjö Municipality

Area
  - Total: 38.23 km^{2} (14.76 sq mi)
- Elevation: 167 m (548 ft)

Population (31 December 2023)
  - Total: 74,052
  - Density: 2,011/km^{2} (5,210/sq mi)
- Time zone: UTC+1 (CET)
  - Summer (DST): UTC+2 (CEST)
- Postal code: 35x xx
- Area code: (+46) 470
- Website: www.vaxjo.se

Växjö (Swedish pronunciation: [ˈvɛ̂kːɧøː]) is a city and the seat of Växjö Municipality, Kronoberg County, Sweden. As of 2023, it had 74,052 inhabitants, out of a total 98,280 municipal residents (2025). It is the administrative, cultural, and industrial centre of Kronoberg County and the episcopal see of the Diocese of Växjö, with Växjö Cathedral at its heart. The city is also home to Linnaeus University.

== Etymology ==
The city's name is believed to be derived from the words väg ("road") and sjö ("lake"), meaning the road over the frozen Växjö Lake that farmers used in the winter to get to the marketplace which later became the city.

== History ==
In contrast to what was believed a century ago, there is no evidence of a special pre-Christian significance of the site. The pagan cultic center of Värend may have been located at Hov, a nearby village.

Växjö became the seat of a diocese in the late 1160s, when it was separated from the Diocese of Linköping. The new diocese covered only the five districts of Värend and was established in a settlement that at the time lacked urban character. Its foundation has been linked to the cult of Saint Sigfrid, who was venerated as Växjö’s patron saint. Around this time, a stone church dedicated to Sigfrid and John the Baptist was built, forming the basis of what later became Växjö Cathedral. The city received its first charter in 1342, issued by Magnus Eriksson. During the Middle Ages, Växjö had relatively few religious institutions: a hospital of the Holy Ghost was first mentioned in 1318, and a Franciscan monastery was established in 1485. The city’s first school, Växjö katedralskola, was founded in the 14th century and granted gymnasium status in 1643.

At the beginning of Gustav Eriksson's war of liberation, the peasantry joined forces, under the guidance of the union-hostile bishop Ingemar Pedersson, with the mountain men and peasantry of Dalarna, Hälsingland, and Gästrikland, who urged fidelity to their leader Gustav Eriksson. During the Dacke War, a peasant uprising, the city was under the authority of Nils Dacke and his supporters from the summer of 1542 until after New Year 1543.

Several times during the Northern Wars and the Scanian Wars, and thereafter, the city was affected by fire (in 1277, 1516, 1570, 1612, 1658, 1690, 1749, 1753, 1799, 1838 and 1843). After the last fire in 1843, when 1,140 citizens were rendered homeless, Växjö received its current street plan.

=== Modern times ===
Växjö is the city in which the photograph "A Woman Hitting a Neo-Nazi With Her Handbag" was taken in 1985 by Hans Runesson.

In its 2015 report, the Araby district was classified as a särskilt utsatt område (especially vulnerable area) by the Swedish Police. However, according to the 2021 report, its classification was improved to a risk area.

== Historic buildings ==
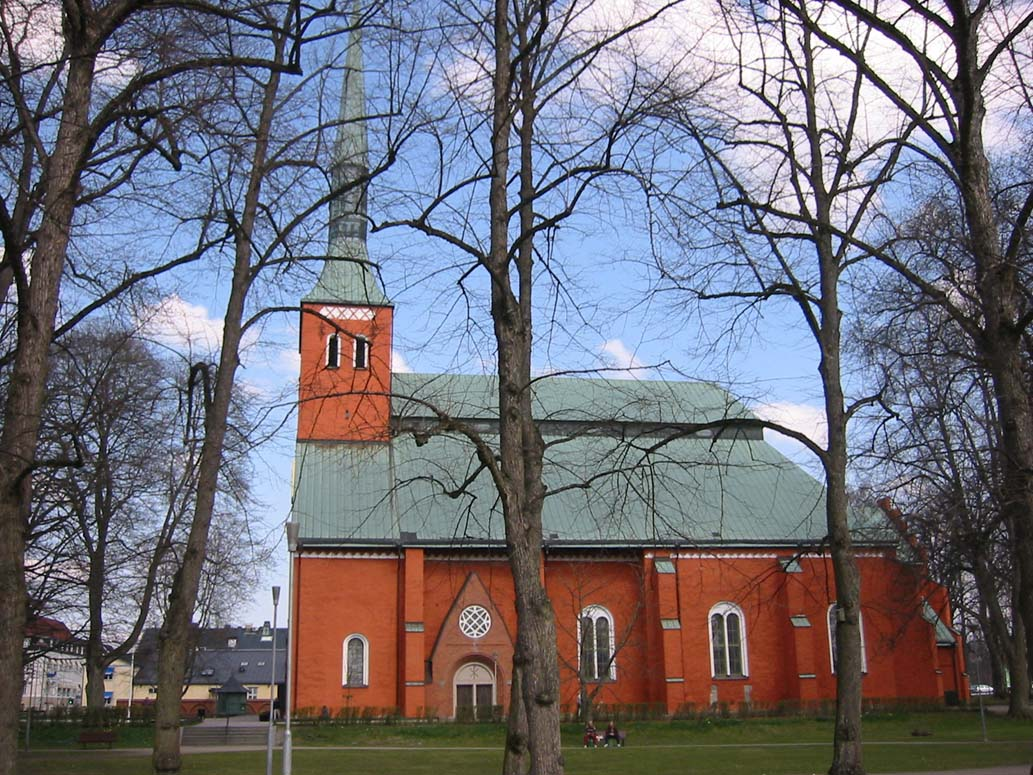
Växjö Cathedral

Växjö Cathedral is located near the centre of the city and dates back to around 1300.

Immediately north of Växjö is Kronoberg Castle, a ruined fortress constructed in the 15th century. This castle was used as a base by the rebel, Nils Dacke, during the Dacke War. The fortress has thick walls and artillery portals that face north towards lake Helgasjön.

Teleborg Castle is also located near the city. It was built near the Linnaeus University in 1900, it now functions as a hotel and conference facility.

== Amenities ==
The Swedish Emigrant Institute was established in 1965, and is housed in the House of Emigrants near Växjö Lake in the heart of the city. It contains archives, a library, a museum, and a research center relating to the emigration period between 1846 and 1930, when 1.3 million (or 20%) of the Swedish population emigrated, mainly to the United States. Archives dating to the 17th century contain birth and death records, as well as household records, that are available on microfiche.

== Economy ==
Industries include GE Power and Aerotech Telub, as well as Volvo Articulated Haulers, located in Braås 29 kilometres (18 miles), north of Växjö. One of the best-known service providers is Fortnox and Visma.

Växjö houses Sweden's National Glass Museum and claims to be the capital of the "Kingdom of Crystal" as well as of the "Kingdom of Furniture". Växjö Linnaeus Science Park focuses on supporting entrepreneurs focusing on circular economy, smart city, forestry and digitalization.

== Demography ==
Historical population

| Year | Pop. | ±% |
|---|---|---|
| 1960 | 22,784 | — |
| 1965 | 29,354 | +28.8% |
| 1970 | 39,019 | +32.9% |
| 1975 | 40,328 | +3.4% |
| 1980 | 42,632 | +5.7% |
| 1985 | - | — |
| 1990 | 46,735 | — |

| Year | Pop. | ±% |
|---|---|---|
| 1995 | 49,865 | +6.7% |
| 2000 | 51,790 | +3.9% |
| 2005 | 55,600 | +7.4% |
| 2010 | 60,887 | +9.5% |
| 2015 | 65,345 | +7.3% |
| 2016 | 66,275 | +1.4% |
| 2020 | 71,282 | +7.6% |

=== Population numbers by city districts ===
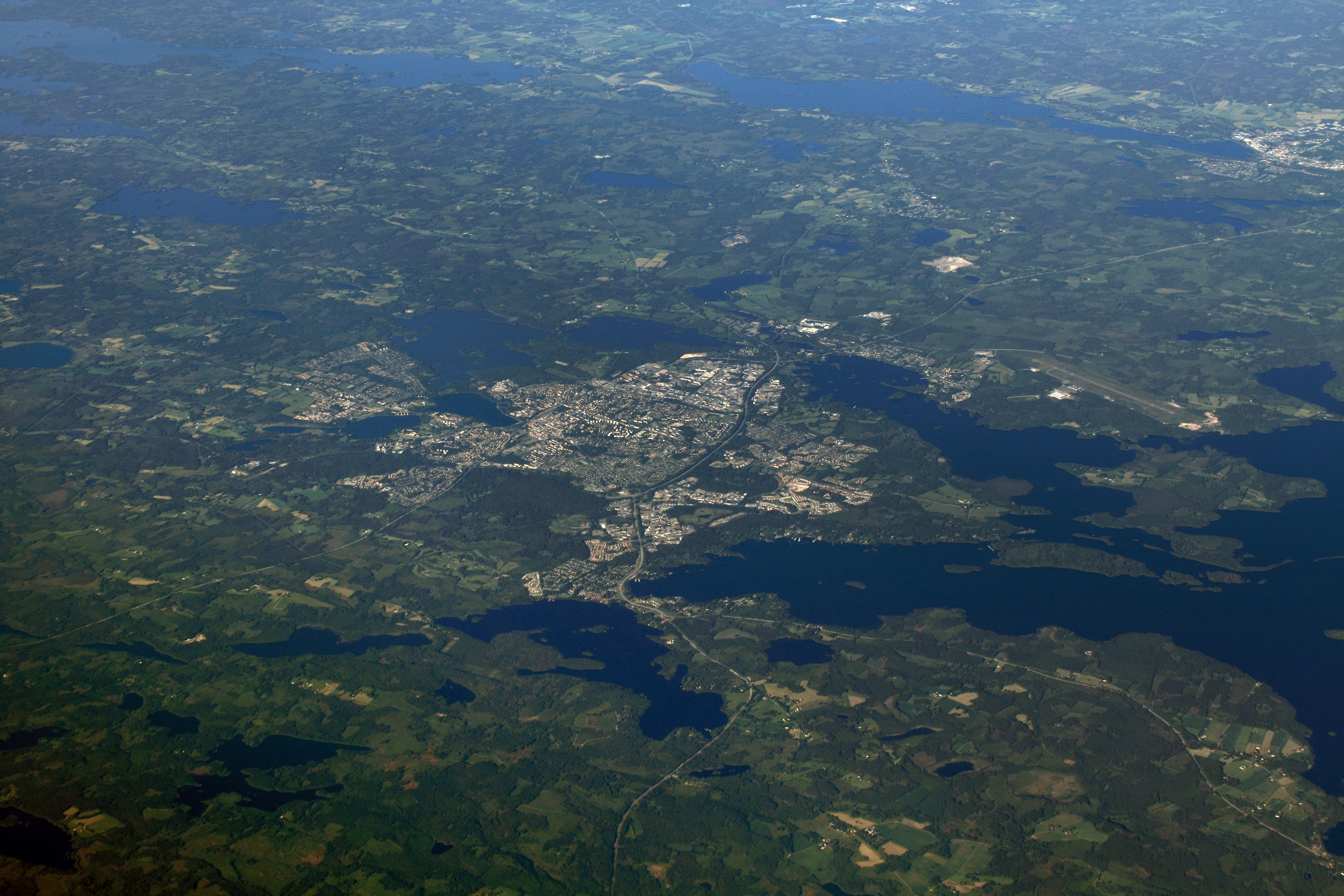
Aerial view of Växjö surrounded by lakes; west is up in the image.

- Teleborg: 12,834
- Hovshaga: 9,541
- Hov: 8,020
- Araby: 6,520
- Norr: 4,518
- Väster: 4,829
- Öster: 4,489
- Söder: 3,694
- Sandsbro: 3,090
- Högstorp: 2,710
- Öjaby: 2,213
- Centrum: 2,086
- Räppe: 1,260
- Kronoberg/Evedal: 279
- Regementstaden: 88
- Västra mark: 69
- Norremark: 29

== Transport ==
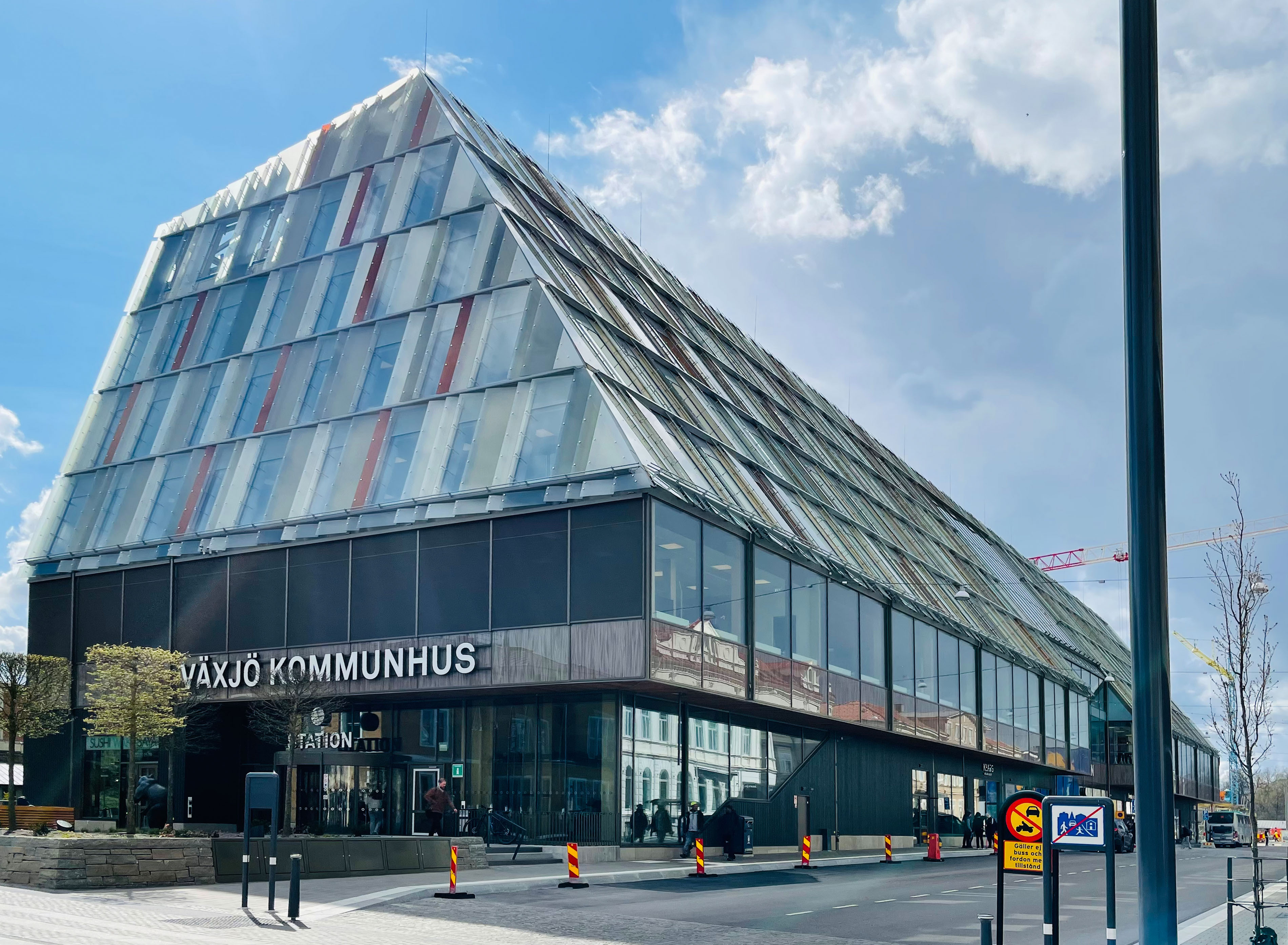
Växjö Railway Station And City Hall

Växjö’s railway station, renovated in 2021, is situated on the Coast-to-Coast Line, which crosses the municipality from northwest to southeast. All trains servicing Växjö also stop in Alvesta, 16 kilometres (9.9 mi) to the east, where the line connects with the Southern Main Line, offering services to Malmö and Stockholm. Long-distance SJ trains connect Växjö to Gothenburg, Kalmar and other stops on the Coast-to-Coast Line, while Öresundståg services provide direct links to Kalmar, Malmö, Copenhagen and other locations in Småland and Scania. In addition, regional Krösatågen trains connect Växjö with cities and towns across Småland and northern Scania, including Jönköping, Värnamo, Nässjö and Hässleholm.

Trunk roads 23, 25, 27, 29, 30 and 37 meet in the municipality.

There are regional and local busses operated by Länstrafiken Kronoberg connecting Växjö's center with residential neighborhoods and other localities in the region. Växjö’s local bus network comprises twelve urban lines that radiate from the central Stortorget square, effectively serving as a hub for transfers. Most lines offer direct connections to Växjö's railway station, while line 4 connects the city to Växjö-Kronoberg Airport.

Växjö-Kronoberg Airport, located about 7 kilometres (4.3 mi) northwest of the city centre, offers year-round services to Alicante and Stockholm Bromma, in addition to seasonal charter flights. Seasonal services are offered to several holiday destinations in Spain, Greece, Andorra and Eastern Europe. The nearest major airports are Göteborg Landvetter Airport, located 206 kilometres (128 mi) north west and Copenhagen Airport, located 275 kilometres (171 mi) south west of Växjö.

== Environmental policy ==
In 1996 the city adopted a policy for the elimination of the use of fossil fuels by 2030. This decision was taken in reaction to pollution and eutrophication in the lakes that surround the town. Greenhouse gas emissions were cut by 41% from 1993 to 2011, and were reduced by 55% by 2015. The city's economy has grown during this time.

Växjö uses a variety of strategies to make progress towards being fossil fuel-free. Waste from the local forest industry is burned to generate power. Half of Växjö's electricity and over 90% of the energy used for heating comes from trees. Biogas and renewable energy fuel the city's public transportation, and cycling is promoted as an alternative mode of transport. New buildings are constructed using wood and are designed to be energy efficient.

By 2014, Växjö's CO_{2} emissions had dropped to 2.4 tonnes per capita, well below the EU average of 7.3 tonnes.

=== The Greenest City in Europe ===
Växjö has called itself "The Greenest City in Europe" since 2007. It has its foundation in a long history of commitment to environmental issues, and ambitious goals for a sustainable future, a vision shared by local residents and businesses.

Växjö was awarded the 2018 European Green Leaf Award by the European Commission, becoming the first Swedish city to receive the title. Växjö was recognised for its early commitment to sustainability, becoming the first Swedish city to use biomass for district heating, among the first Swedish cities to engage with the UN 2030 Agenda for Sustainable Development. The city’s environmental strategy also included promoting urban agriculture and the preservation of natural areas and green spaces. Furthermore, Växjö promoted sustainable transport through initiatives such as a biogas-fuelled bus fleet, expanded cycling and pedestrian infrastructure, and measures to reduce traffic noise and air pollution.

== Education ==
The city has three municipality-run secondary schools ("gymnasiums"): Teknikum, Katedralskolan, and Kungsmadskolan. Linnaeus University had a student body of 42,000 students as of 2012 (including its Kalmar campus) or 15,000 students (full-time equivalents) as of 2010.

There are many public and private middle/high schools, such as Kronoberg Skola.

== Notable people ==
- Joachim Björklund, footballer
- Jonas Björkman, tennis player with 50 doubles titles including Grand Slams
- Karl-Birger Blomdahl, 20th century music composer
- Maria Cederschiöld (deaconess)
- Bjorn Englen, bass player of Yngwie Malmsteen's Rising Force
- Knute Heldner, 20th-century Swedish American artist
- Emil Johansson, ice hockey player for the Providence Bruins of the AHL
- Stefan Johansson, Formula 1 racing driver
- Jonas Jonasson, writer
- Owe Jonsson, track and field athlete and European champion
- Martin Kellerman, comic strip creator
- Carolina Klüft, track and field athlete and Olympic gold medalist at Athens 2004
- Pär Lagerkvist, author and winner of the Nobel Prize in Literature 1951
- Otto Lindblad, 19th century music composer
- Carl Linnaeus, botanist, physician and zoologist
- John Lundvik, singer, represented Sweden in Eurovision Song Contest 2019
- Moa Munoz, musician and bass player in Olivia Rodrigo's band
- Christina Nilsson, 19th century soprano celebrity
- Andreas Ravelli, footballer
- Thomas Ravelli, football goalkeeper
- Sophie Sager, 19th century writer and feminist
- Peder Sjögren, 20th century author and playwright
- Jonas Swensson, President of the Augustana Evangelical Lutheran Church
- Håkan Syrén, a military General and Supreme Commander of the Swedish Armed Forces
- Esaias Tegnér, poet and bishop of Växjö
- Per Tengstrand, pianist
- Mats Wilander, tennis player with seven Grand Slam victories 1982–1988
- Björn Wirdheim, racing driver
- The Ark, rock band
- Bullet, heavy metal band
- Melody Club, rock band

== Sport and leisure ==
The following sports clubs are located in Växjö:

- Östers IF – football
- Hovshaga AIF – football, floorball, and tennis
- Växjö BK – football
- Växjö Lakers – ice hockey
- Växjö Vipers – floorball
- Wexjö RK – rugby
- Växjö Ravens BBK - basketball
- Växjö OK – orienteering
- Växjö DFF – football
- Växjö United FC – football
- Växjö VK – Volleyball

=== Speedway ===
- A speedway team rode at the Växjö Motorstadion, inaugurated on 5 June 1949 (the site of the current Räppe football pitch on Solängsvägen). They team competed in the 1950 Swedish speedway season before being the home for Dackarna in 1956. The venue held rounds of the Individual Speedway World Championship in 1952, 1957 and 1958.

== Climate ==
Växjö has a humid continental climate (Dfb), using temperature data from 1961 to 1990. Temperatures have risen in recent years, and using the -3 Celsius isotherm, it can also be classified as an oceanic climate (Cfb) with 2002-2015 temperature data. It is milder, wetter, and cloudier than the rest of the country, with its sunshine hours more comparable to the British Isles than to areas further north in Sweden. Considering its relative distance to all three coasts surrounding South Sweden, the climate is markedly maritime, with winter temperatures being relatively mild for an inland location. When compared with sunnier inland areas further north, Växjö has relatively cool summers.

Climate data for Växjö (2002–2018 averages, extremes since 1901)
| Month | Jan | Feb | Mar | Apr | May | Jun | Jul | Aug | Sep | Oct | Nov | Dec | Year |
|---|---|---|---|---|---|---|---|---|---|---|---|---|---|
| Record high °C (°F) | 9.6 (49.3) | 13.8 (56.8) | 20.0 (68.0) | 27.9 (82.2) | 29.0 (84.2) | 34.4 (93.9) | 33.5 (92.3) | 34.4 (93.9) | 27.6 (81.7) | 21.9 (71.4) | 14.0 (57.2) | 11.3 (52.3) | 34.4 (93.9) |
| Mean maximum °C (°F) | 6.4 (43.5) | 6.9 (44.4) | 13.4 (56.1) | 19.3 (66.7) | 24.6 (76.3) | 26.9 (80.4) | 28.6 (83.5) | 27.4 (81.3) | 22.7 (72.9) | 16.4 (61.5) | 10.8 (51.4) | 7.5 (45.5) | 29.5 (85.1) |
| Mean daily maximum °C (°F) | 0.5 (32.9) | 1.1 (34.0) | 5.4 (41.7) | 11.9 (53.4) | 17.0 (62.6) | 20.0 (68.0) | 22.5 (72.5) | 21.0 (69.8) | 17.0 (62.6) | 10.4 (50.7) | 5.5 (41.9) | 2.3 (36.1) | 11.2 (52.2) |
| Daily mean °C (°F) | −1.7 (28.9) | −1.4 (29.5) | 1.6 (34.9) | 6.8 (44.2) | 11.6 (52.9) | 14.7 (58.5) | 17.5 (63.5) | 16.4 (61.5) | 12.8 (55.0) | 7.2 (45.0) | 3.4 (38.1) | 0.3 (32.5) | 7.4 (45.4) |
| Mean daily minimum °C (°F) | −3.8 (25.2) | −3.8 (25.2) | −2.3 (27.9) | 1.6 (34.9) | 6.2 (43.2) | 9.4 (48.9) | 12.4 (54.3) | 11.8 (53.2) | 8.6 (47.5) | 4.2 (39.6) | 1.3 (34.3) | −1.8 (28.8) | 3.7 (38.6) |
| Mean minimum °C (°F) | −13.8 (7.2) | −12.1 (10.2) | −10.0 (14.0) | −3.6 (25.5) | 0.2 (32.4) | 4.2 (39.6) | 7.7 (45.9) | 6.7 (44.1) | 2.2 (36.0) | −3.5 (25.7) | −6.4 (20.5) | −10.6 (12.9) | −16.2 (2.8) |
| Record low °C (°F) | −34.0 (−29.2) | −28.8 (−19.8) | −29.8 (−21.6) | −19.0 (−2.2) | −6.0 (21.2) | −0.8 (30.6) | 3.5 (38.3) | 0.0 (32.0) | −4.8 (23.4) | −10.3 (13.5) | −17.8 (0.0) | −24.5 (−12.1) | −34.0 (−29.2) |
| Average precipitation mm (inches) | 50.5 (1.99) | 36.0 (1.42) | 31.7 (1.25) | 28.8 (1.13) | 51.6 (2.03) | 67.3 (2.65) | 89.6 (3.53) | 77.9 (3.07) | 49.4 (1.94) | 64.6 (2.54) | 57.0 (2.24) | 54.6 (2.15) | 659 (25.94) |
| Mean monthly sunshine hours | 32 | 57 | 143 | 203 | 236 | 238 | 234 | 191 | 153 | 88 | 37 | 24 | 1,636 |
Source 1: SMHI
Source 2: SMHI Monthly Data
