= Katedralskolan, Växjö =

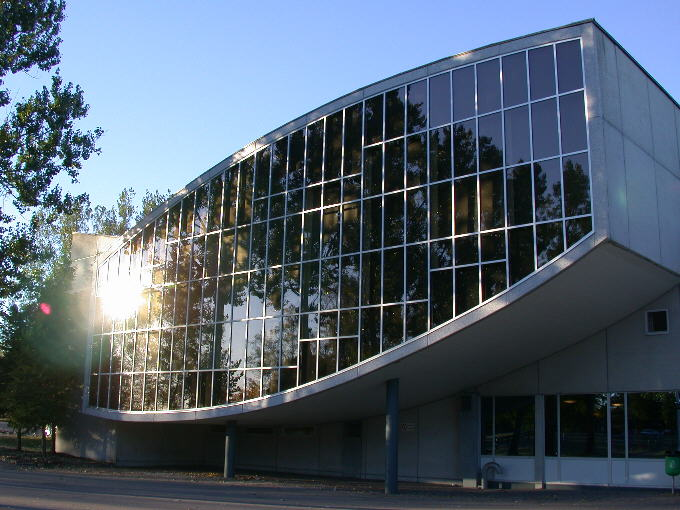

Location
- Växjö, Kronoberg County; Sweden
- Coordinates: 56°52′52″N 14°49′13″E

Information
- Type: Public
- Established: 17th century
- School district: Växjö
- Principal: Henrik Ahlin (since 2017)
- Staff: 145 (2006)
- Grades: 10th, 11th and 12th
- Enrollment: 1325 (2006)
- Language: Main: Swedish, English (IB Diploma Programme); Other: Spanish, French, German, Italian, Russian, Japanese, Latin
- Nickname: Katedral, Katte
- Alumni: Carl Linnaeus; Viktor Rydberg; Pär Lagerkvist; Peter Jihde; Charlotte Perrelli; Ola Salo; Carolina Klüft; Shirley Clamp; Martin Axén
- Nobel laureates: Pär Lagerkvist (literature)
- Website: www.katedralskolan.se

Katedralskolan (Swedish: 'the cathedral school') is a high school in Växjö, Sweden.

== History ==
Katedralskolan in Växjö has a long history, receiving the right to become an upper secondary school (gymnasium in Swedish) in 1643. It thus became the sixth Swedish gymnasium. As of 2021 Katedralskolan has 1394 students and five educational programs.

The botanist Carl Linnaeus became a pupil of the school in 1716.

== Programs ==
- ES (esthetics)
- IB (International Baccalaureate)
- ID (athletics)
- HU (humanities)
- NV (natural sciences)
- SP (social sciences)
- EK (economy)
