= Carl Möller =

Swedish architect

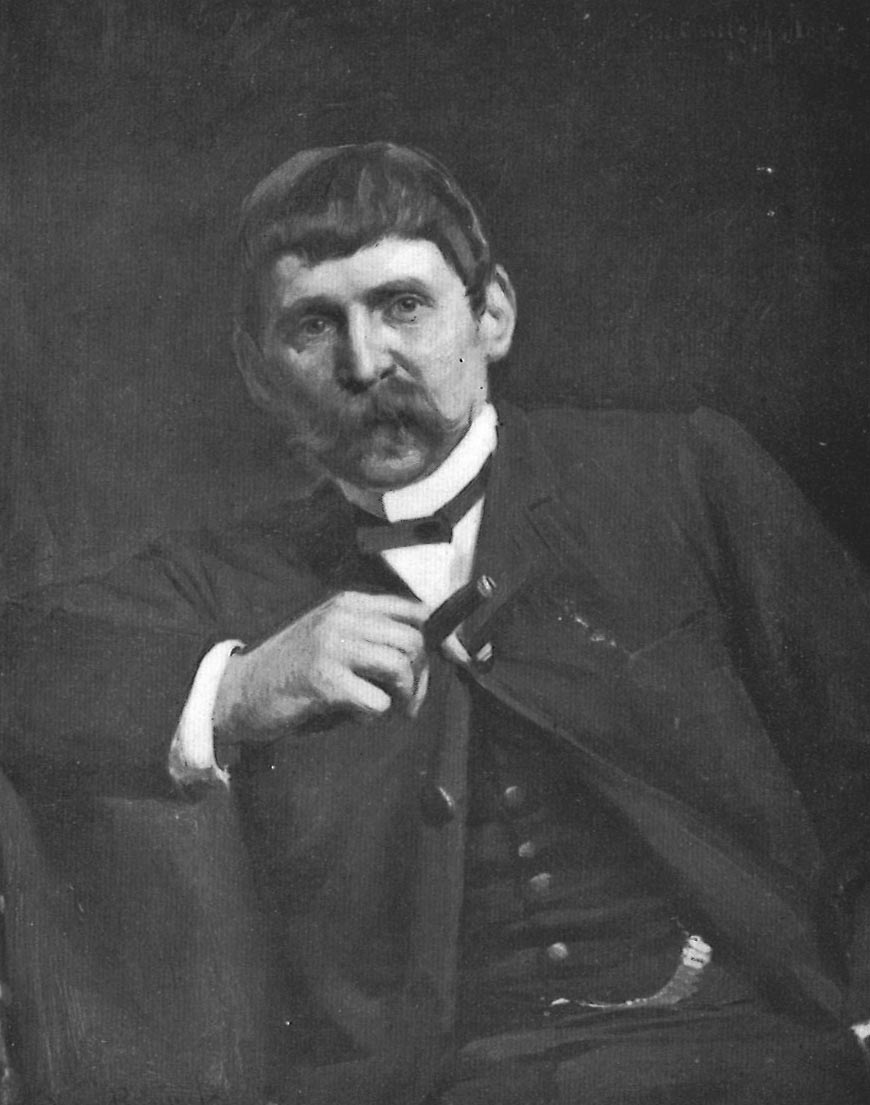
Carl Möller. Portræt malet af hans kunstnersven Oscar Björck

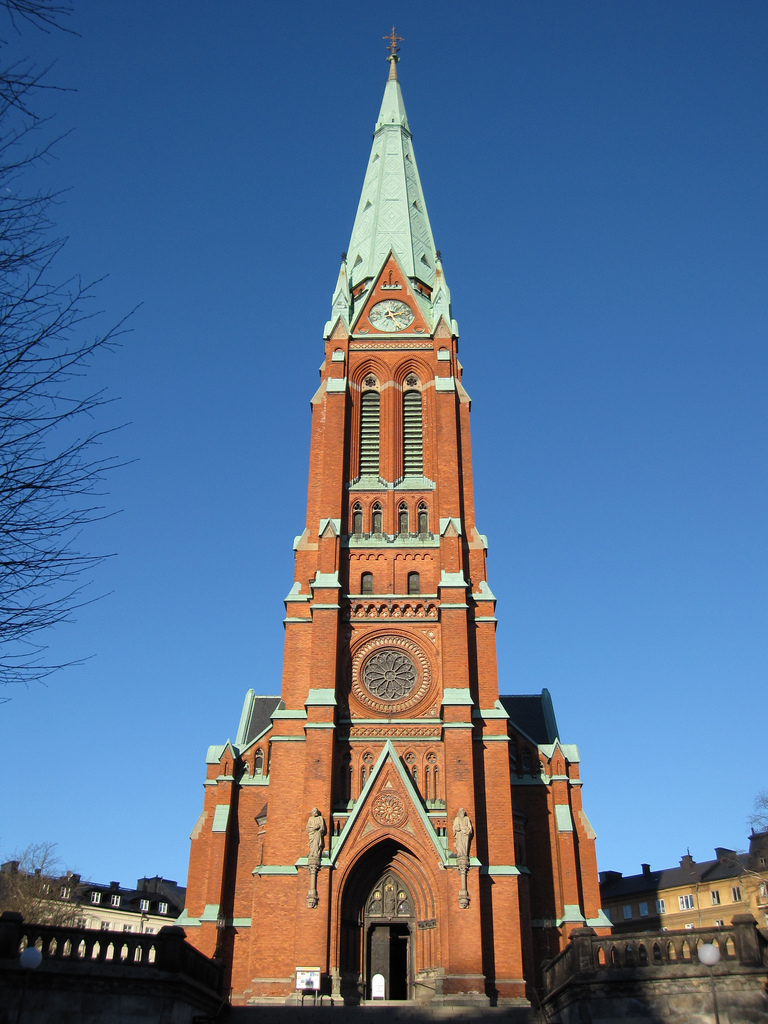
St. John's Church, Stockholm

Carl Oskar Möller (20 April 1857 - 4 December 1933) was a Swedish architect and public official, since 1896 married to Dagmar Bosse. His most well-known works include St. John's Church in Stockholm, which opened in 1890. Möller was in his time in architectural arrangement terms one of the foremost exponents among Swedish architects.

== Life and career ==
Möller was born in Malmö, Sweden. He was educated in Stockholm at Konstfack from 1870 to 1873, and at the Royal Swedish Academy of Arts between 1873 and 1879, when he was awarded with the Royal Medal. The years 1879-1881, he made a study trip to Germany, France, England, Italy and Austria and was in the winter of 1879-80 in Paris, as a student at the École des Beaux-Arts (Atelier Guadet).

He lived then in Stockholm, but made several trips abroad, especially to Paris. In 1881 he became architect in the Office of the Superintendent (Överintendentsämbetet), a government agency in charge of public buildings, in 1903 Chief Curator, in 1904 Superintendent and 1918-1924 General Director of the Board of Public Buildings (Byggnadsstyrelsen), the successor agency of the Office of the Superintendent.

In addition to his civil service career, Möller performed several assignments. He was the construction manager at the General Art and Industrial Exposition of Stockholm (1897) and member of its central Committee, the same year member of the Administrative Committee for Sweden's participation in the World's fair in Paris in 1900. In 1898 member of the Sanatorium Building Committee, member of the Royal Swedish Academy of Arts in 1890 and in 1901 a member of its management board, as well as honorary member of the Royal Swedish Academy of Letters, History and Antiquities. Also in 1901 he was member of the Jubilee Fund's Board of Directors, in 1906 Chairman of the Technical School's Board of Directors and in 1911 President of the Committee of Regalia. He took part in the 1914 Baltic Exhibition in Malmö, San Francisco Exhibition in 1915, and the 1925 Internal Art Industrial Exhibition in Paris.

A bronze copy of the statue of Saint George and the Dragon was built on Möller's initiative and erected in 1912 in a street of Stockholm's Old Town. Möller's most treasured works are in pure Gothic style with splendid terrace construction like the neo-Gothic St. John's Church, Stockholm (S:t Johannes kyrka), which was inaugurated the 1890. In Stockholm, he led in 1891 the repair work on Katarina Church (Katarina Church) and in 1893 on Saint James's Church (Sankt Jacobs kyrka). All together he created or restored about 40 churches in Sweden as well as several schools buildings.

== Buildings ==
- Gladsax church (1883, rebuilding of the tower)
- Landala chapel (1885)
- Ignaberga new church (1885–1887)
- Orlunda church (1888–89)
- St. John's Church, Stockholm (1890)
- Johannes Elementary School, Stockholm (1890)
- Tegneby church (1891)
- Eslövs church (1891)
- Gustaf Adolf church (1892)
- Stockholms Education Centre (1893)
- Villa Lusthusporten, Djurgården in Stockholm
- Söderala church (1899)
- Regional Archives in Lund (1903)
- St. Stephen's Church, Stockholm (1904)
