= Kullander =

Kullander is a Swedish surname. Notable people with the surname include:

- Fang Fang Kullander (1962–2010), Swedish-Chinese ichthyologist
- Sven O. Kullander (born 1952), Swedish ichthyologist
- Sven Kullander (physicist) (1936–2014)
- Tiantian Kullander (1992–2022), Swedish-Chinese entrepreneur and investor

== See also ==
- 11013 Kullander, a main-belt asteroid named for the physicist
- Kurlander
