= Enskilda Gymnasiet =

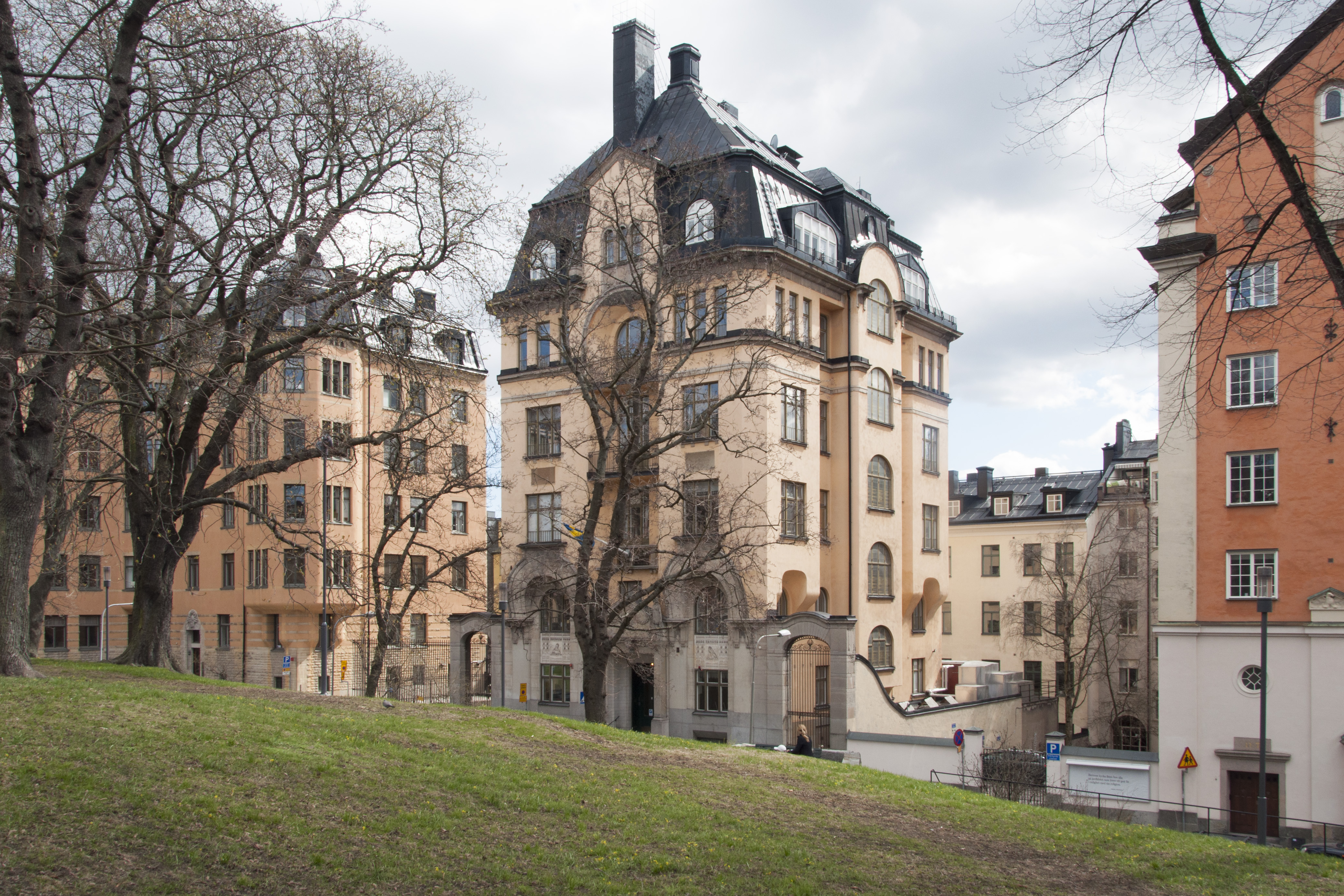
- School building on Tegnérlunden 5

Location
- Tegnérlunden 5 Stockholm; Sweden
- Coordinates: 59°20′16.80″N 18°03′21.60″E

Information
- School type: Private school
- Motto: Kärlek som grund. Ordning som stöd, Framsteg som mål. (Love as a foundation. Order as support. Progress as a goal.)
- Established: 1913
- Headmaster: Pia Mörk Ahlberg
- Enrollment: 500 (both school and upper secondary school)
- Website: http://www.enskildagymnasiet.se

Enskilda Gymnasiet (EG) is an independent secondary school from the 10th–12th grade and school from the 7th–9th grade, founded in 1913. Enskilda Gymnasiet is located at Tegnérlunden 5 near Tegnérlunden, in central Stockholm, Sweden. Based on standardised national tests, the school usually ranks amongst the highest in Sweden.

The school has about 500 students in total. For upper secondary school students, Enskilda Gymnasiet offers the Social Science Programme and the Natural Science Programme.

For the lower grades (lower secondary school) there are long waiting lists, as the school only accepts 60–90 new students each year.

The school is the 10-year champion of DN Nutidsorientering, a general knowledge competition, in which over 90 percent of all schools in Sweden participate. Enskilda Gymnasiet is widely regarded as one of the top schools in Sweden and has been attended by several royal children.

== History ==
Enskilda Gymnasiet was founded by a group of academics in 1913, and is currently owned by the parents of the students. The school's first location was Biblioteksgatan 32. Since 1973 the school has been housed at Tegnerlunden 5 in a building originally designed by architecture firm Hagström & Ekman in 1906. The building was previously the home of Wallinska Skolan.

== Facilities ==
Educational facilities include classrooms, an art studio, and a hall for music. EG also has an auditorium, with decorations intact from the building's inauguration, inspired by contemporary opera halls.

== Sports ==
Active engagement in sports is strongly encouraged at EG. Students are invited to participate in sports outside of the regular education and can also qualify to represent the school through different teams and participate in the long-running tournaments of SIPSI (Sweden's Boarding and Private Schools' Sports Organization).

The school's athletic education is primarily held at the facilities of the Royal Institute of Technology and Östermalms Idrottsplats.

== Relationships with other schools ==
Traditionally EG has strong ties and rivalries, especially in sports, with Lundsbergs Skola, SSHL, Viktor Rydbergs Gymnasium Djursholm and Grennaskolan. These schools are the other members of SIPSI.

Japanska Skolan i Stockholm (ストックホルム日本人補習学校 Sutokkuhorumu Nihonjin Hoshū Gakkō), a weekend Japanese school, holds its classes at Enskilda Gymnasiet.

== Alumni ==
Well-known alumni of Enskilda Gymnasiet include:

- Victoria, Crown Princess of Sweden
- Princess Madeleine, Duchess of Hälsingland and Gästrikland
- Prince Carl Philip, Duke of Värmland
- Karl-Johan Persson, CEO of H&M
- Aron Flam (born 1978), comedian, podcaster, and writer, and actor
- Elsa Hosk, supermodel
- Magnus Uggla, pop and rock singer
- Anna Kinberg Batra, Moderate Party politician
- Jessica Rosencrantz, Moderate Party politician
- Ludwig Svennerstål, equestrian
- Carl Bildt, former Swedish prime minister and leader of the Moderate Party
- Tiantian Kullander, a Swedish-Chinese entrepreneur and investor
