= Erik Glemme =

Swedish designer and landscape architect

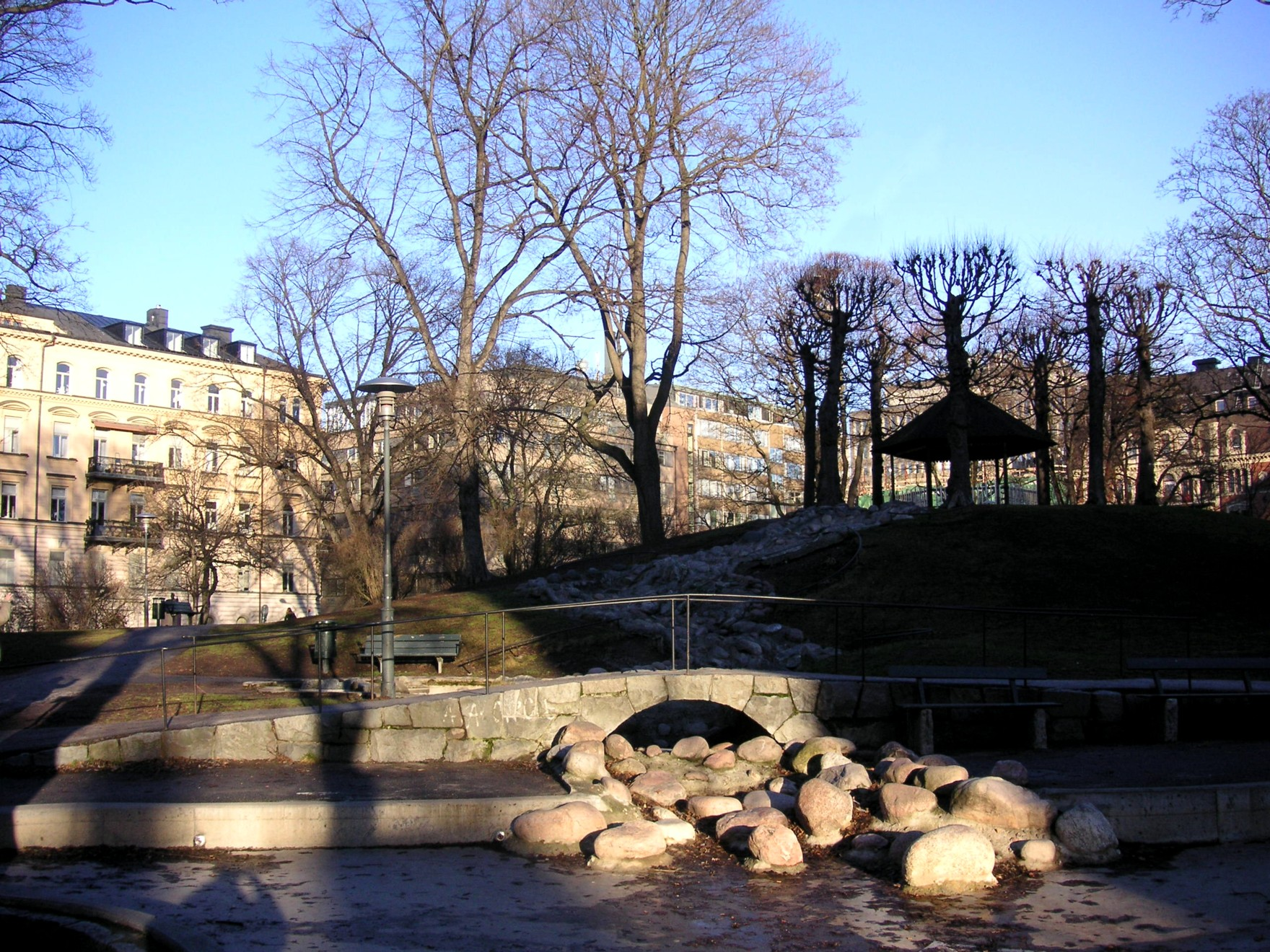
Tegnérlunden remodelled in 1940

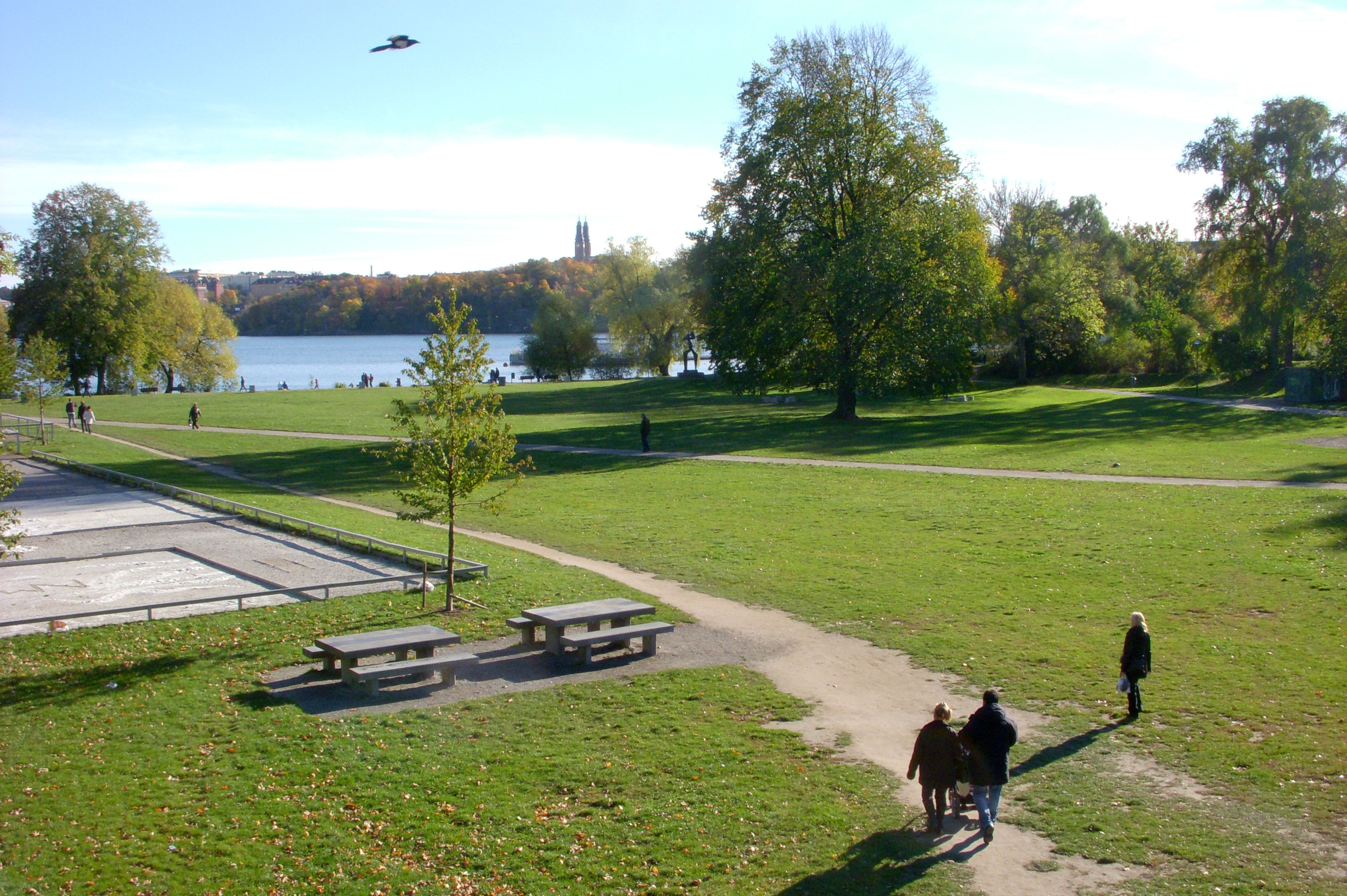
Rålambshovsparken opened in 1936

Erik Glemme (27 May 1905- 20 January 1959) was a Swedish designer and landscape architect.

== Biography ==
Glemme was born in Jönköping, Sweden. He trained at the Royal Institute of Technology in Stockholm from 1927 to 1929. He apprenticed with architect Osvald Almqvist (1884–1950). He was employed at the Royal Institute of Technology as an assistant 1943-1947 and as a teacher 1947–1952. From 1936 to 1956 he was chief architect of the design office of the city of Stockholm Parks Department.

His work includes Mälarpaviljongen, a landscape park on Norr Mälarstrand, which he designed with landscape architect Holger Blom (1906-1996). Other notable works include the remodelling of Tegnérlunden and Vasaparken in Stockholm, design of Rålambshovsparken in the Marieberg district of Kungsholmen which opened in 1936 and Grynkvarnsparken in Johanneshov designed in the mid-1950s.
