= Bjärka-Säby Château =

Nya slottet Bjärka-Säby
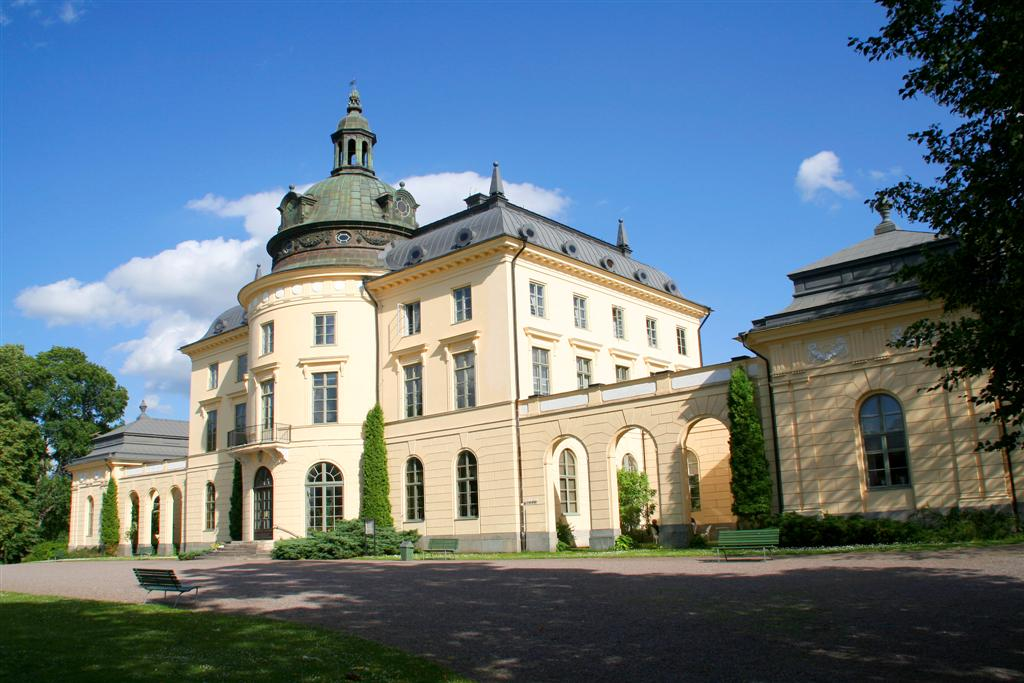
- Front facade of the main building
- Interactive map of the Nya slottet Bjärka-Säby area

General information
- Architectural style: Baroque
- Location: Sweden
- Coordinates: 58°16′14″N 15°44′20″E
- Construction started: 1791
- Completed: 1799

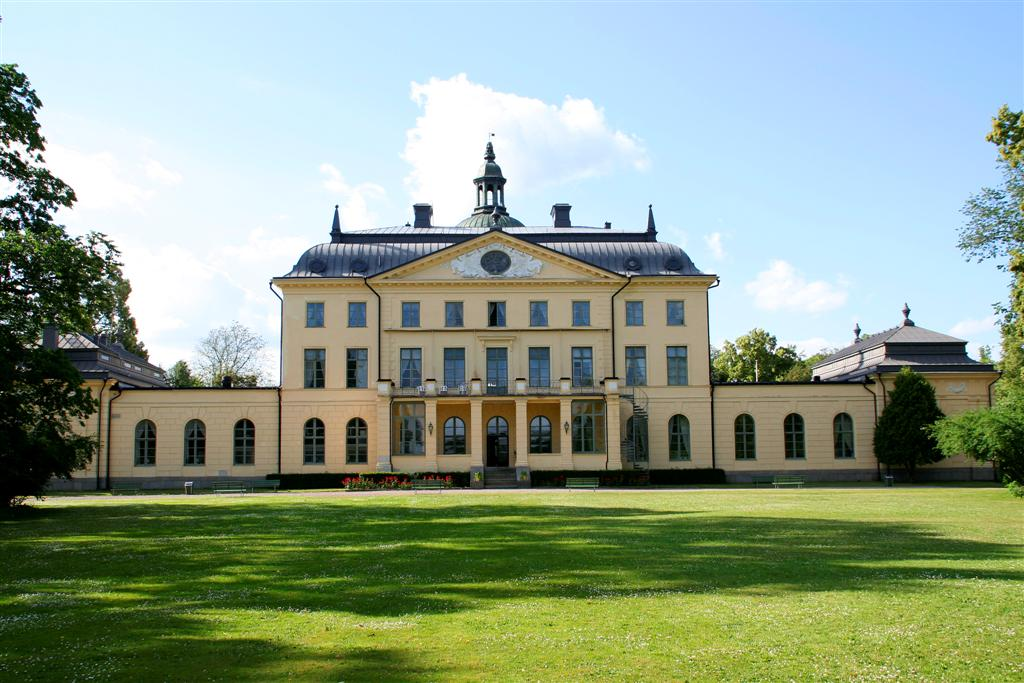
View from South

Bjärka-Säby Château (Swedish: Nya slottet Bjärka-Säby) is a baroque style château located 2 miles southeast of Linköping, 4 kilometers north of Bestorp in Östergötland County, Sweden. In Bjärka-Säby there are actually two châteaus, simply referred to as the old and the new château of Bjärka-Säby. The older building dates from 1632. The new one is owned by the local congregation of the Pentecostal Church. Out of the château's common life, meetings and retreats an ecumenical community has been born, though not a monastery as stated in some articles. This community, Ekumeniska Kommuniteten i Bjärka-Säby (EKiBS), is a community with its members living scattered around Sweden and the other Scandinavian countries but having its main gatherings and heart at the château of Bjärka-Säby.

== History ==
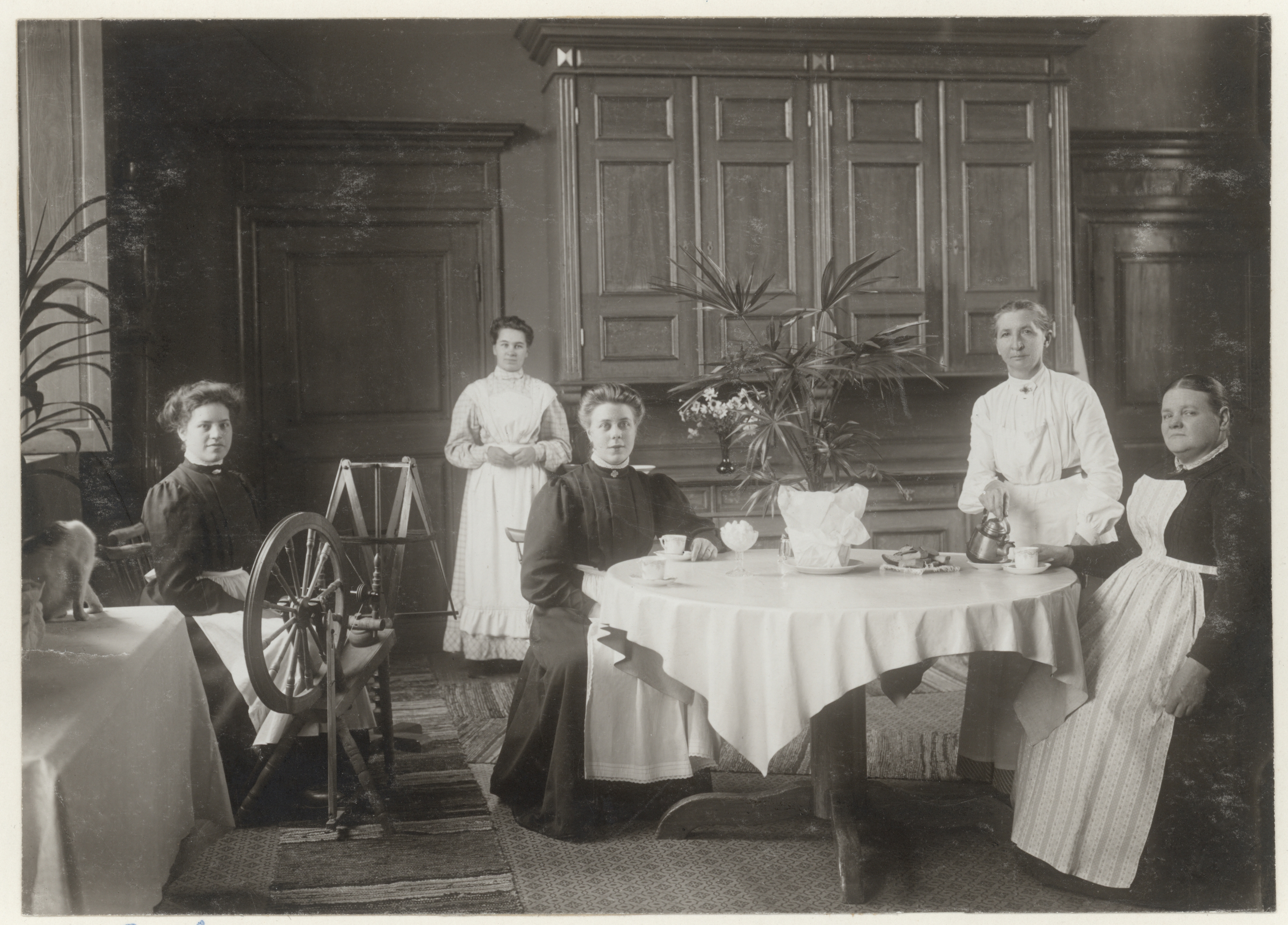
Group portrait of the château's servants in 1909

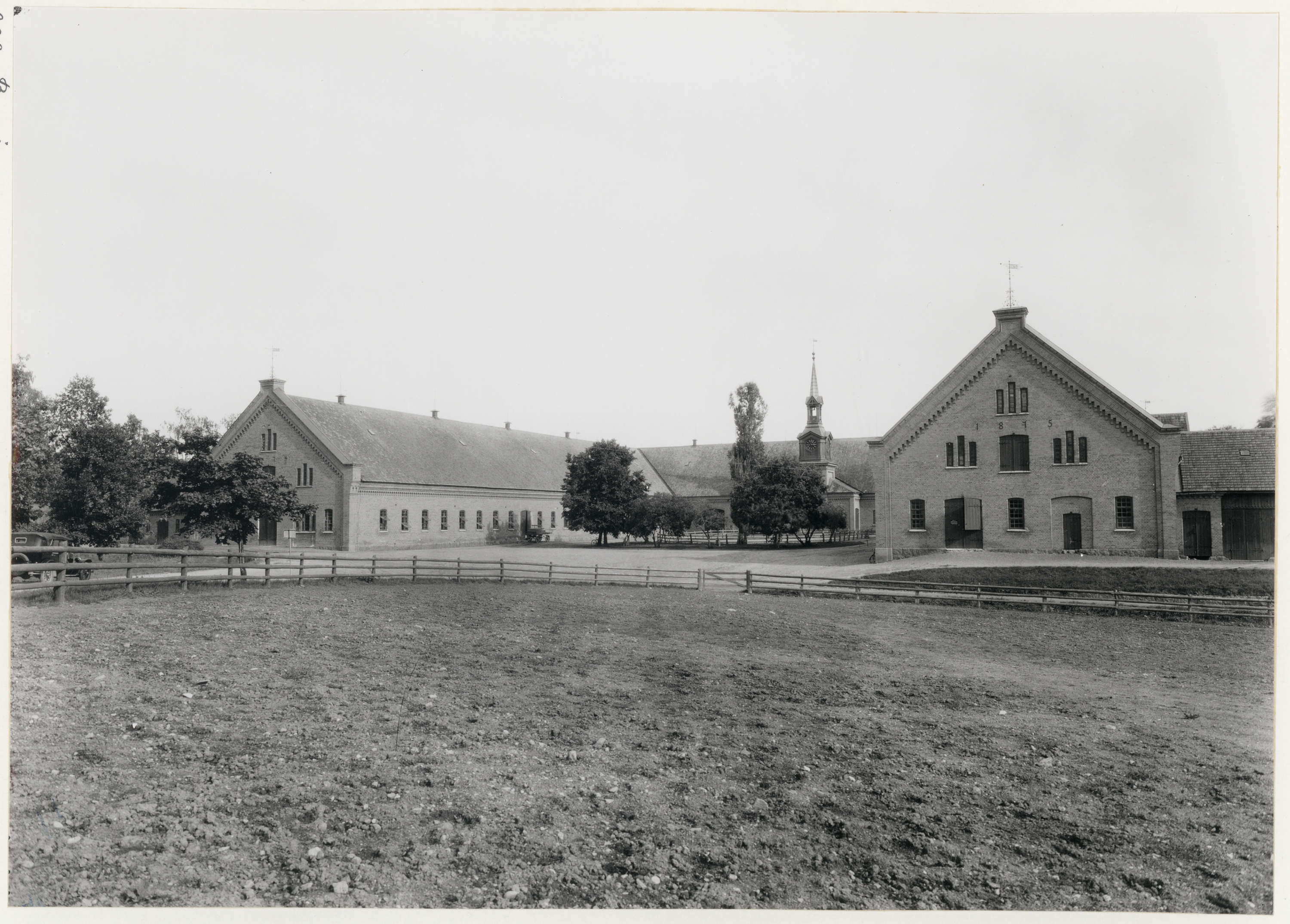
The barn, probably in 1909

A first château was completed in 1632 by lake Stora Rängen.

Bjärka-Säby Château was built for Swedish diplomat and nobleman, Germund Louis Cederhielm. The building was based upon plans from a prominent Swedish landscape architect, Fredrik Magnus Piper. The second château was completed in the 1790s. The surrounding landscape was designed in the manner of a traditional English park. The building was subject to renovation in 1894–1898, based upon plans of architect Agi Lindegren (1858–1927). His work differ from Piper's design and resulted in a Baroque appearance.

Proposals for a restoration of the interior were advanced principally by Sigurd Curman, secretary of the Swedish National Heritage Board. Between 1920 and 1921, Erik Fant, architect at the Nordic Museum, conducted renovations reflecting the manor's origin in the late 1700s. The exterior has been allowed to retain the appearance resulting from the Agi Lindegren-based conversion.

Since 1980, the château has been owned by Sionförsamlingen i Linköping, the Swedish Pentecostal movement's church in Linköping. From 1996 on there are people from different denominations living a common life at the castle, praying, working and studying according to a simple rule. Out of this common life of prayer together with the visitors at retreats and seminars given at the château a need for something "more" arose and this gave birth to the independent Ecumenical Community of Bjärka-Säby with its members scattered throughout Scandinavia though regularly returning to the castle.

Inside the château hang portraits of Hedvig Ekman, Gustaf Aulén, Nathan Söderblom, and icons of Bridget of Sweden as well as traditional icons from the Russian Orthodox, Greek Orthodox, Coptic Orthodox tradition and icons painted by members of the community. The château also has a patristic library, as well as a side chapel that was built in the 18th century as a result of the devotion of the Pietist Lutheran Hedvig Ekman.

Peter Halldorf was the spiritual leader (preces) of the Ecumenical Community of Bjärka-Säby is from the start. New preces from 2017 is Jonas Eveborn.

== See also ==
- List of Baroque residences
