= Tegnérlunden =

Park in Stockholm, Sweden

Coordinates: 59°20′17″N 18°03′16″E

- Interactive map of Tegnérlunden
- Location: Norrmalm/Vasastan, Stockholm, Sweden
- Status: Open all year

Tegnérlunden is a park at the border of city districts Norrmalm and Vasastan in central Stockholm, Sweden.

== History ==
It was originally erected 1890, but was re-constructed in 1940 under the direction of landscape architect Erik Glemme. It is home to statues of two Swedish authors. On a hill in the park's eastern part stands Carl Eldh's massive statue of August Strindberg, erected in 1942. A statue of Astrid Lindgren was erected in 1996. It also lies close to Enskilda Gymnasiet, one of Sweden's most prestigious schools. The story of Astrid Lindgren's children's book Mio min Mio begins in Tegnérlunden. It is there that the boy Bo Vilhelm Olsson meets the genie that takes him to the Land of Faraway.

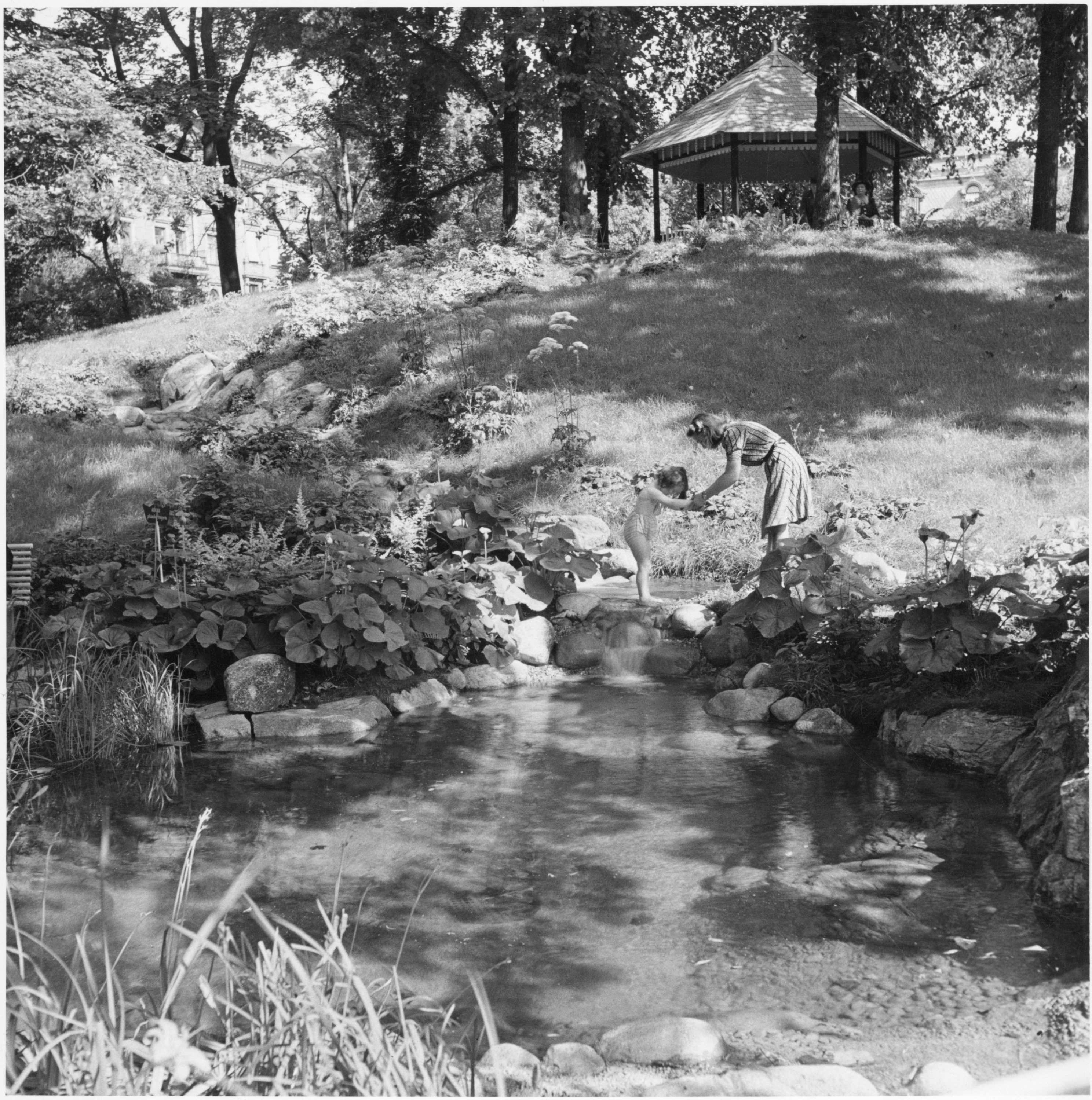
Tegnérlunden in 1947.

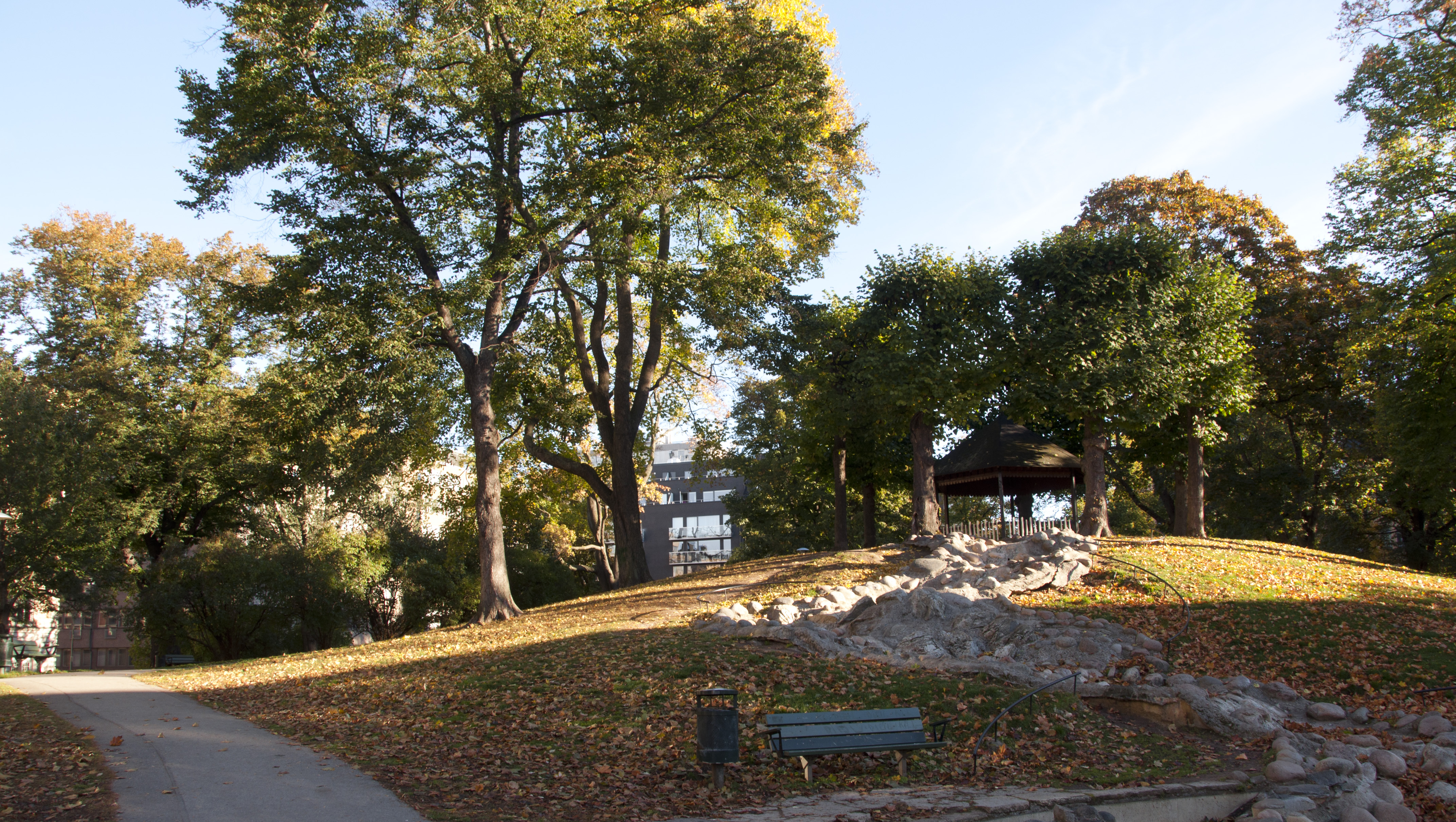
Tegnérlunden in 2010.

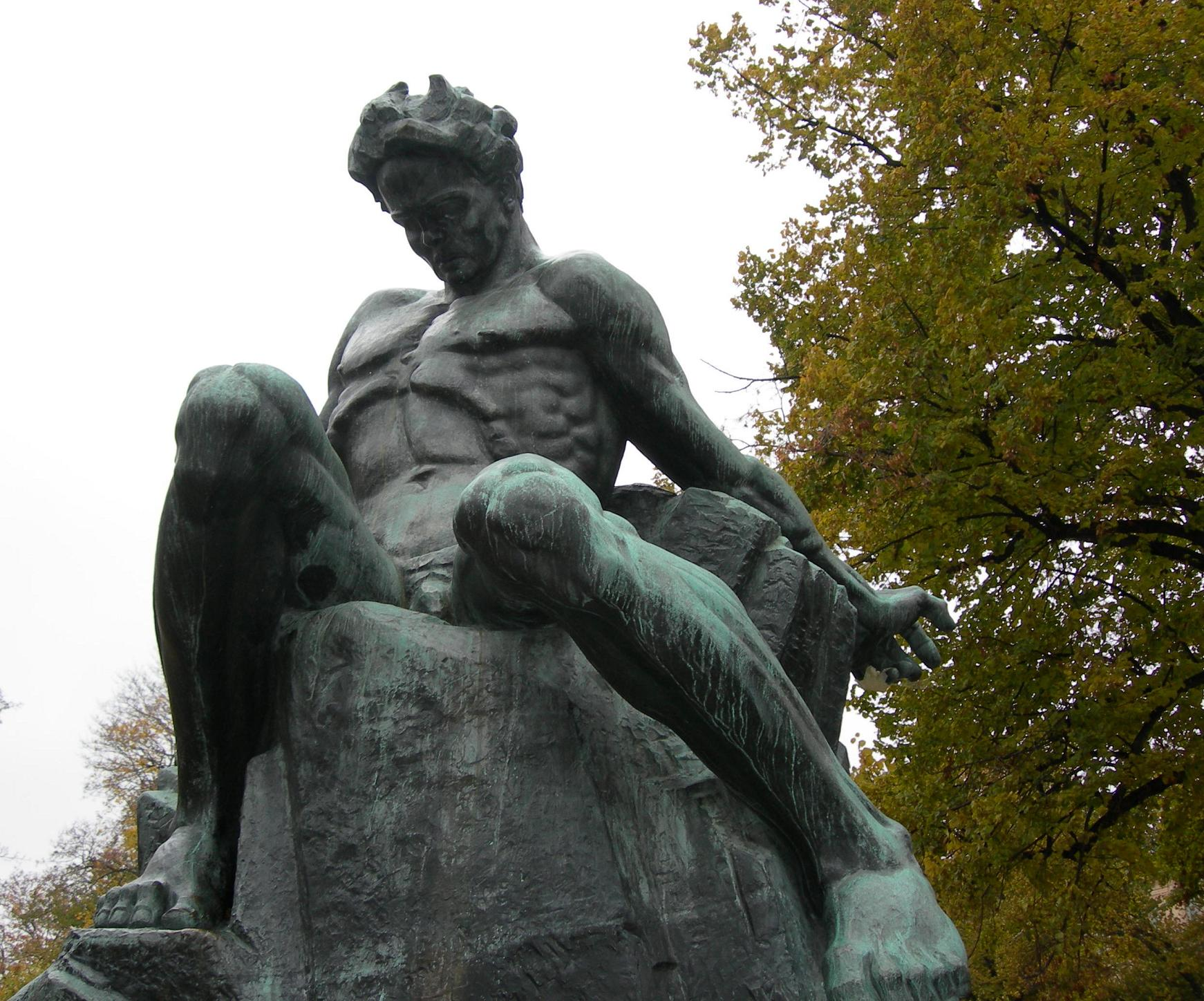
August Strindberg statue by Carl Eldh

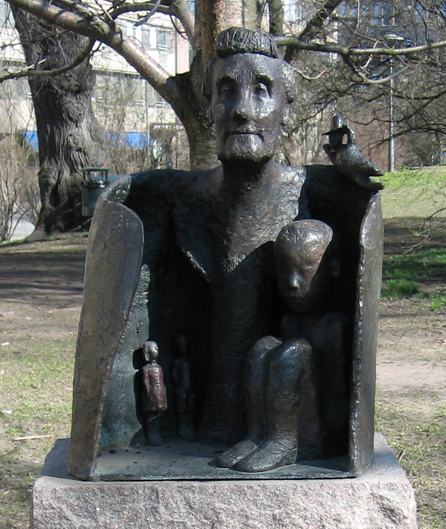
Astrid Lindgren statue by Majalisa Alexanderson
