= Bellevue (Stockholm) =

Park in Stockholm, Sweden

Coordinates: 59°21′12″N 18°02′54″E

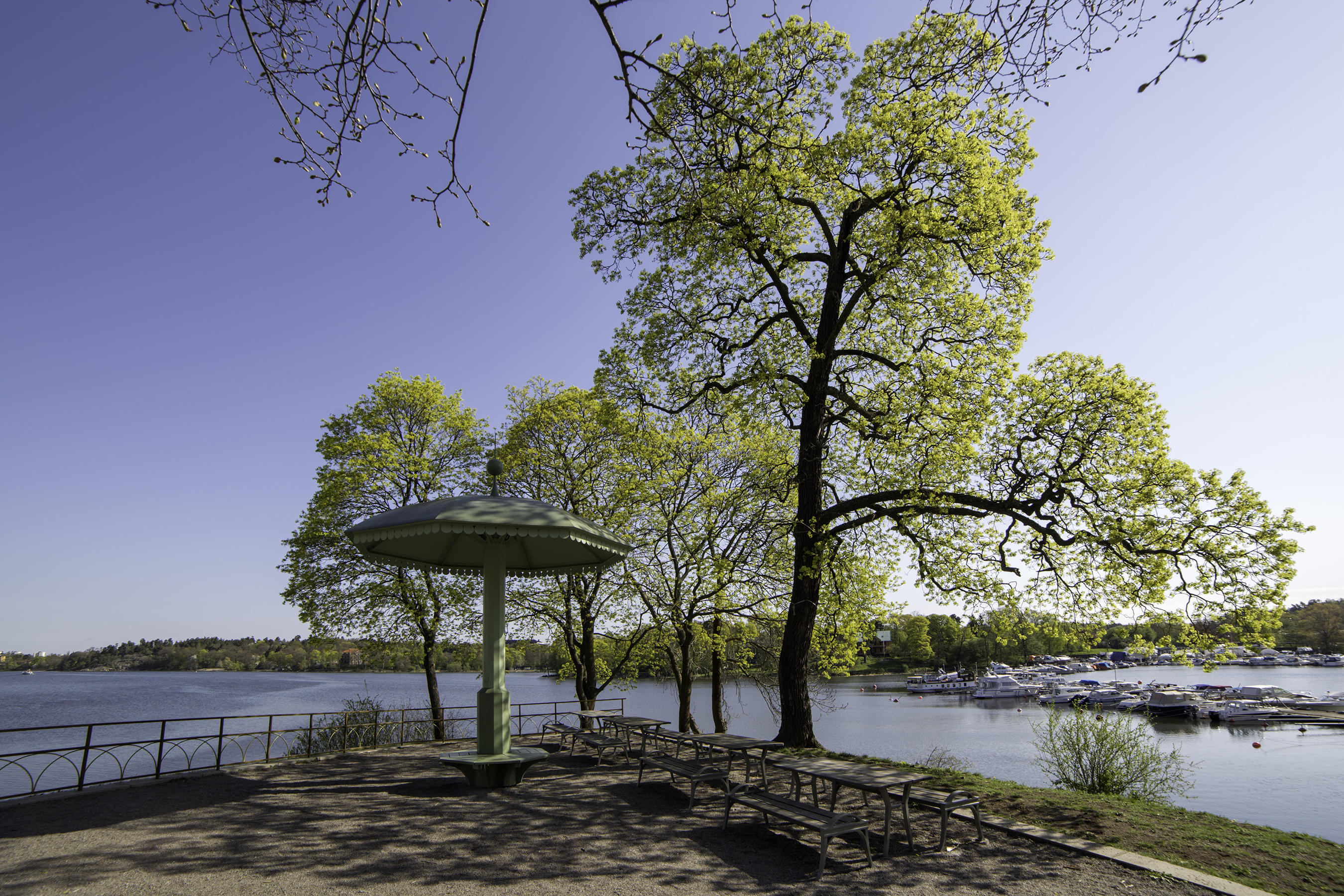
Bellevueparken

Bellevue (Bellevueparken) is a park in central Stockholm, Sweden. Bellevue borders to Vasastan and is part of the Royal National City Park.

== History ==
The park was designed by landscape architect Fredrik Magnus Piper (1746–1824) who also was responsible for creation of the general plan for the royal park Hagaparken in Stockholm.

Bellevue is the site of the former Pasch's farm (Paschs malmgård) which was designed in 1757 for royal court painter Johan Pasch (1706-1769). After extensive and renovation, in 2006 it was opened as a conference center, Bellevue Banquet & Conference (Bellevue Festvåning & Konferen).

Located in Bellevue is also the former studio of the sculptor Carl Eldh (1873-1954). It was here that he lived and worked for more than three decades. Today it is the site of Carl Eldh Studio Museum (Carl Eldhs Ateljémuseum) which was designed in 1919 by architect Ragnar Östberg (1866–1945). The museum contains several hundred sculptures by Carl Eldh. There is also a statue of August Strindberg by Carl Eldh in the park.

== Gallery ==
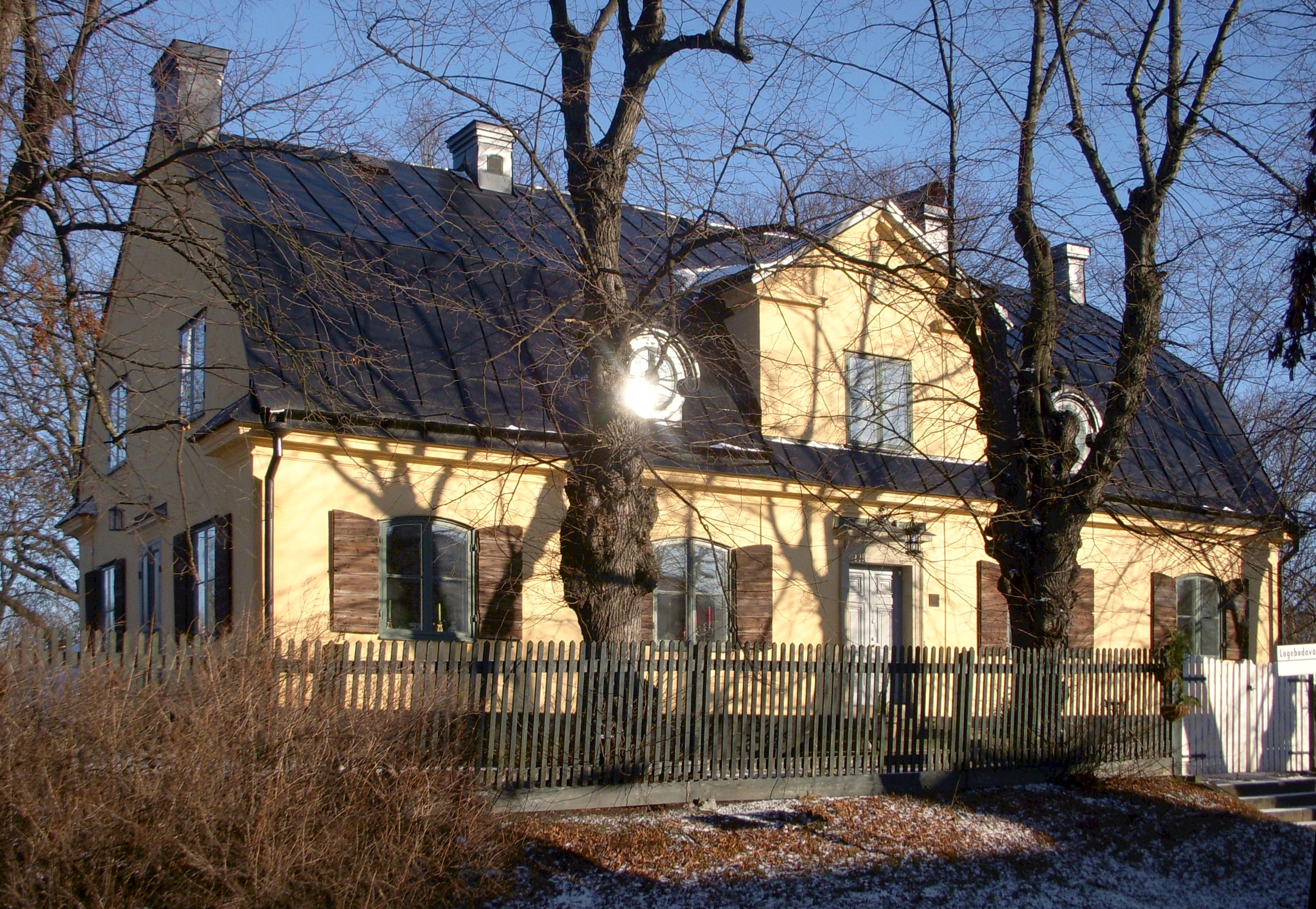
Paschs malmgard

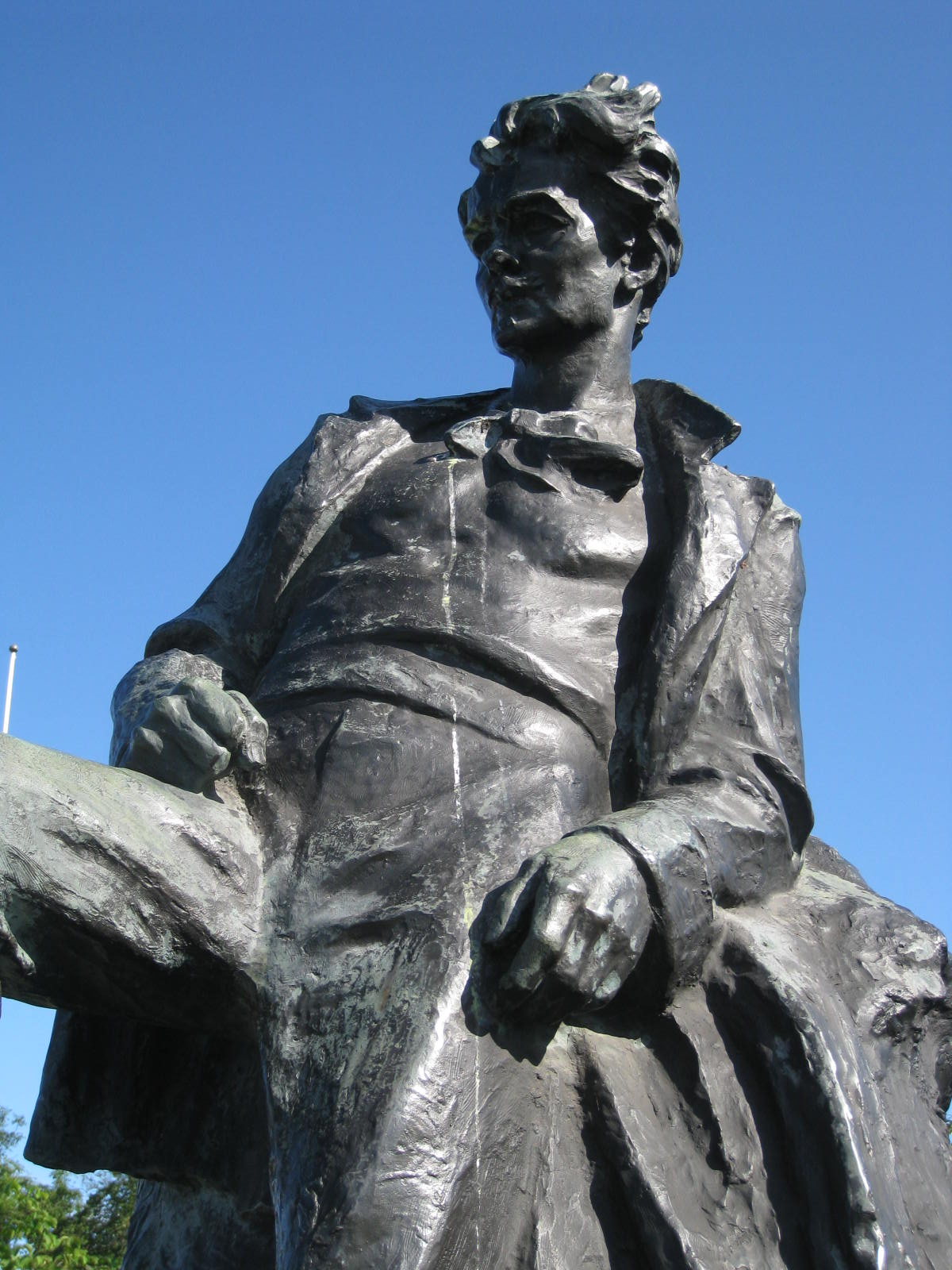
August Strindberg statue

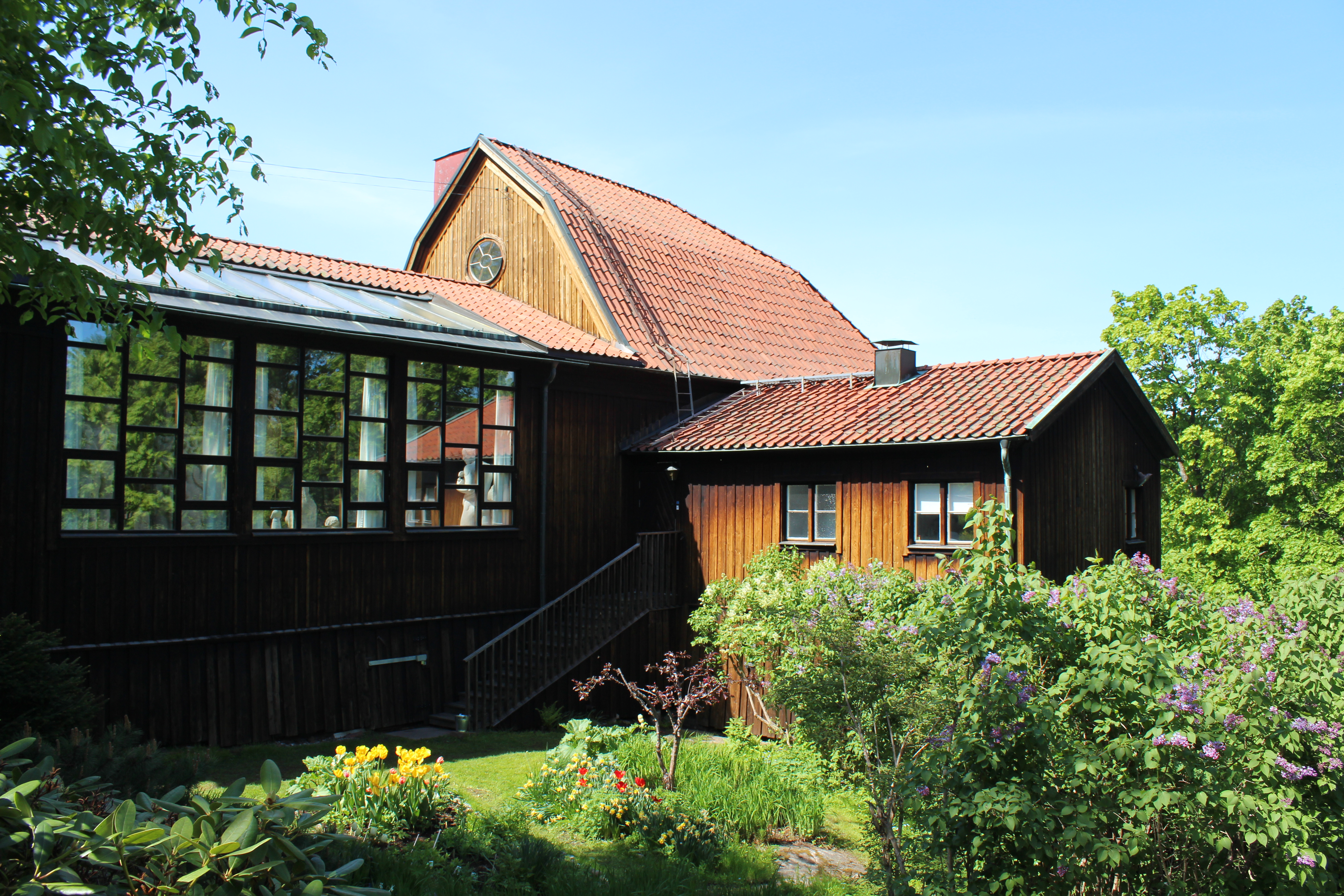
Carl Eldhs Ateljémuseum
