= Carl Eldh =

Swedish artist and sculptor

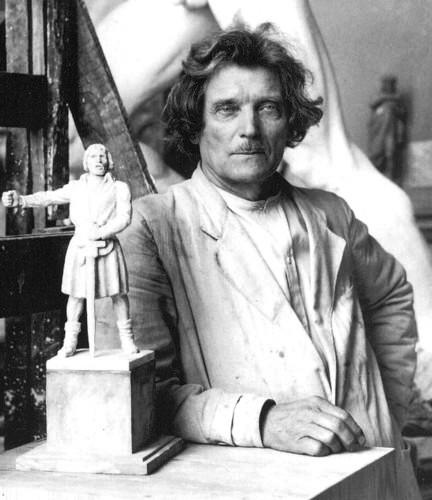
Carl Eldh in 1935

Carl Johan Eldh (10 May 1873 – 26 January 1954) was a Swedish artist and sculptor.

== Biography ==
Eldh was born in Östhammar Municipality, Uppland, the son of Jan Petter Eldh, a blacksmith, and his wife Maria (née Wickman). His younger brother was the artist Albert Eldh. From 1897 through 1904 he studied sculpture at the Académie Colarossi in Paris, where the French sculptor Auguste Rodin inspired him greatly. His first works were characterized by softer forms, but by 1916 he had developed a powerful realistic style, as with the Strindberg Monument in Tegnérlunden in Stockholm. Strindberg was a frequent subject for Eldh.

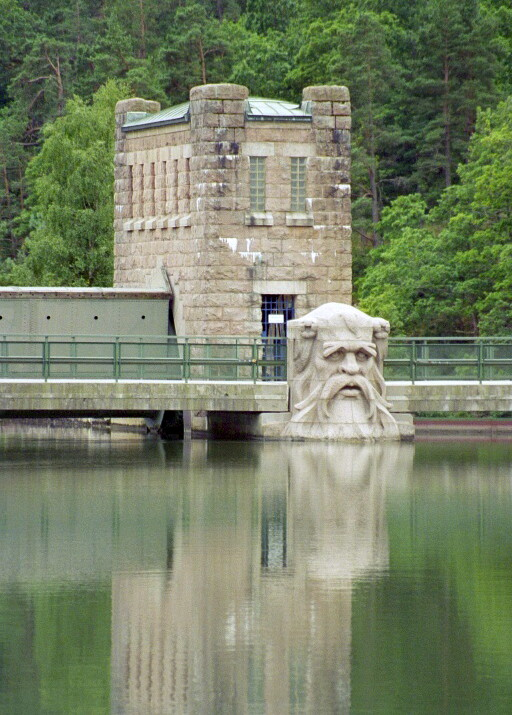
The Nix, Trollhättan, on the River Göta älv

Carl Eldh ranks along Carl Milles with the most popular Swedish sculptors of the first half of the 20th century. Eldh also produced architectural sculpture with renowned Swedish architects, among them Ivar Tengbom, Erik Lallerstedt and Ragnar Östberg. Östberg designed Eldh's own studio in Bellevue Park, in the north of Stockholm, in 1918. It was through Östberg that Eldh received the 1923 contract for park sculptures for the Stadshuspark.

Adjacent to Stockholm City Hall, between the building and the shore of Lake Mälaren's shore, the park stands with Eldh's ensemble representing the three artists, August Strindberg for Authors, Gustaf Fröding for Poets, and Ernst Josephson for Painters, as well as Eldh's bronze sculptures "Sången" and "Dansen" ("The Song" and "The Dance"). The nakedness of the statues initially caused strong protests.

Eldh’s major public works include the grand statue of Strindberg in Stockholm and the Branting Monument, also in Stockholm, which was first executed in plaster around 1930 and completed in 1952. His work was also part of the sculpture event in the art competition at the 1932 Summer Olympics.

The Carl Eldh studio in Bellevue is now a public museum, "Carl Eldh Ateljémuseum", with two studio rooms stocked from floor to ceiling with drawings, sculptures, tools and other personal belongings. A visit reflects not only on the creative activity of an individual sculptor, but allows direct study of his era.

== Images ==
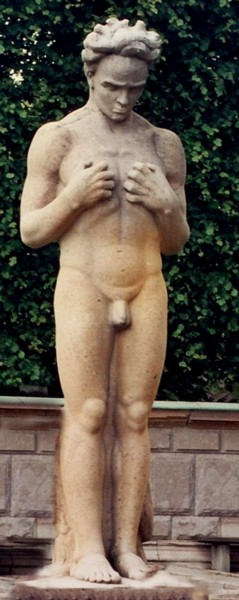
Strindberg

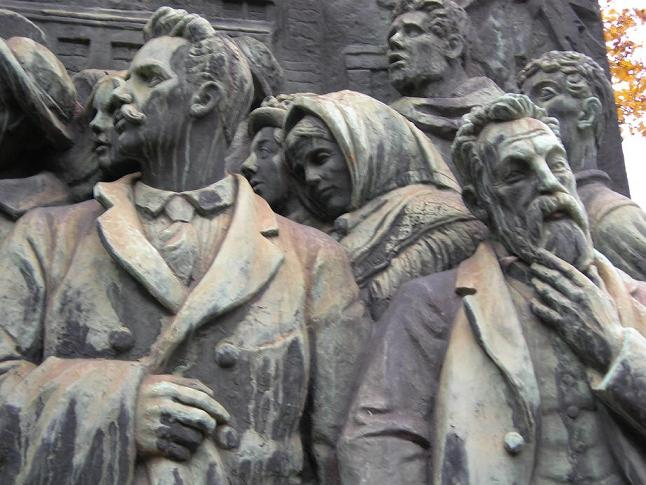
Detail of The Branting Monument

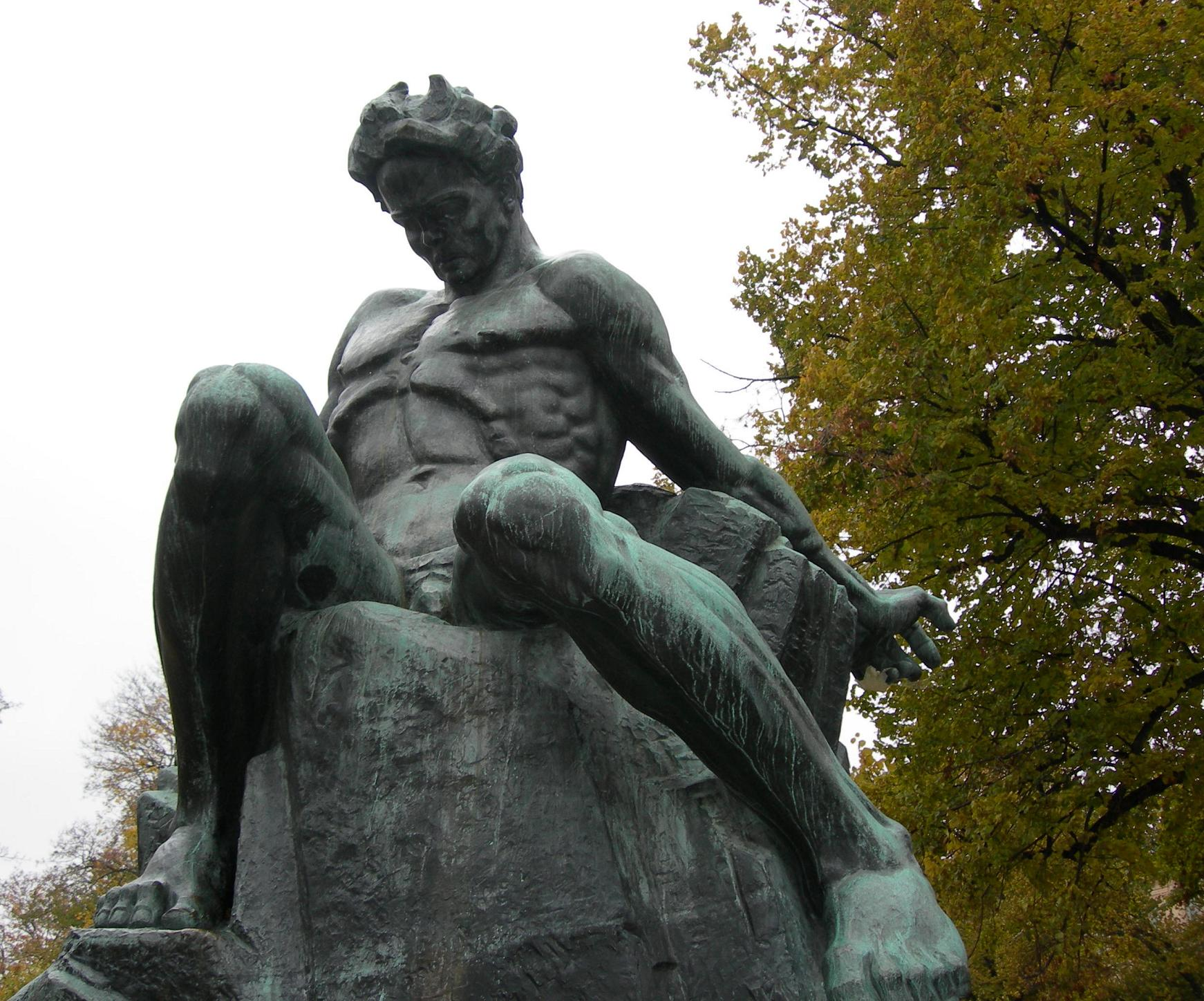
Strindberg Monument, in Tegnérlunden, Stockholm

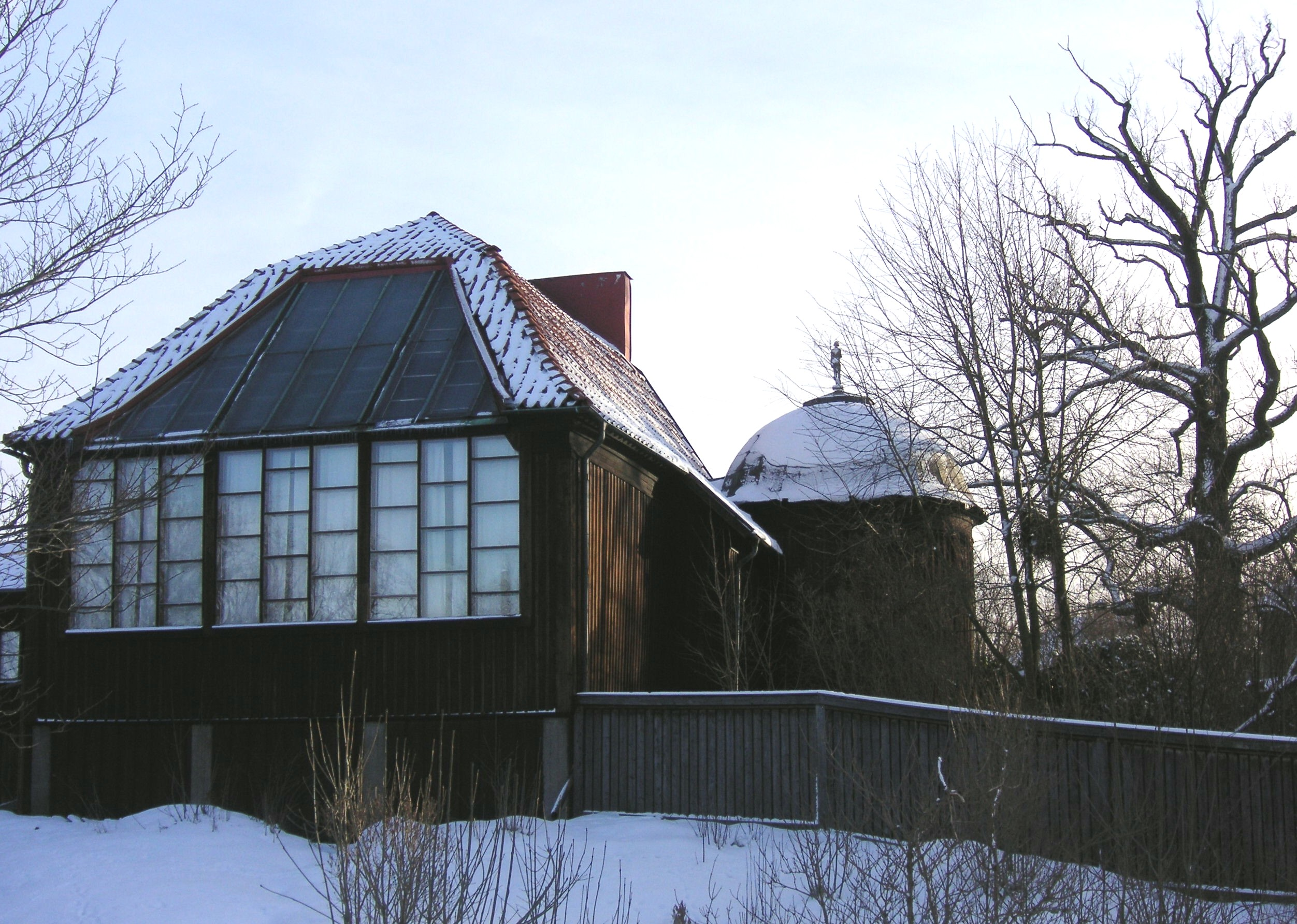
Carl Elds Ateljémuseum, designed by Ragnar Östberg

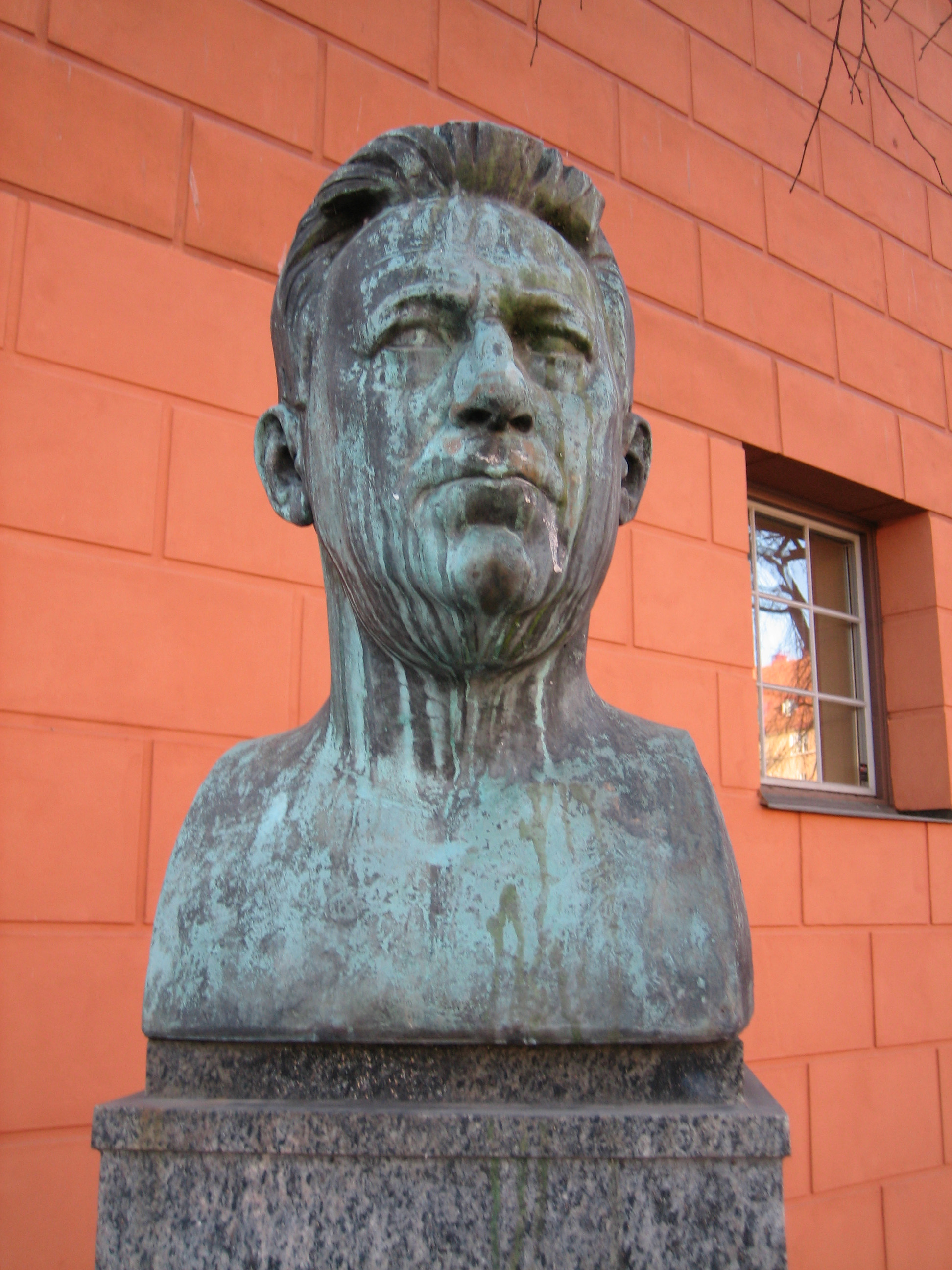
Bust of Fabian Månsson, 1940

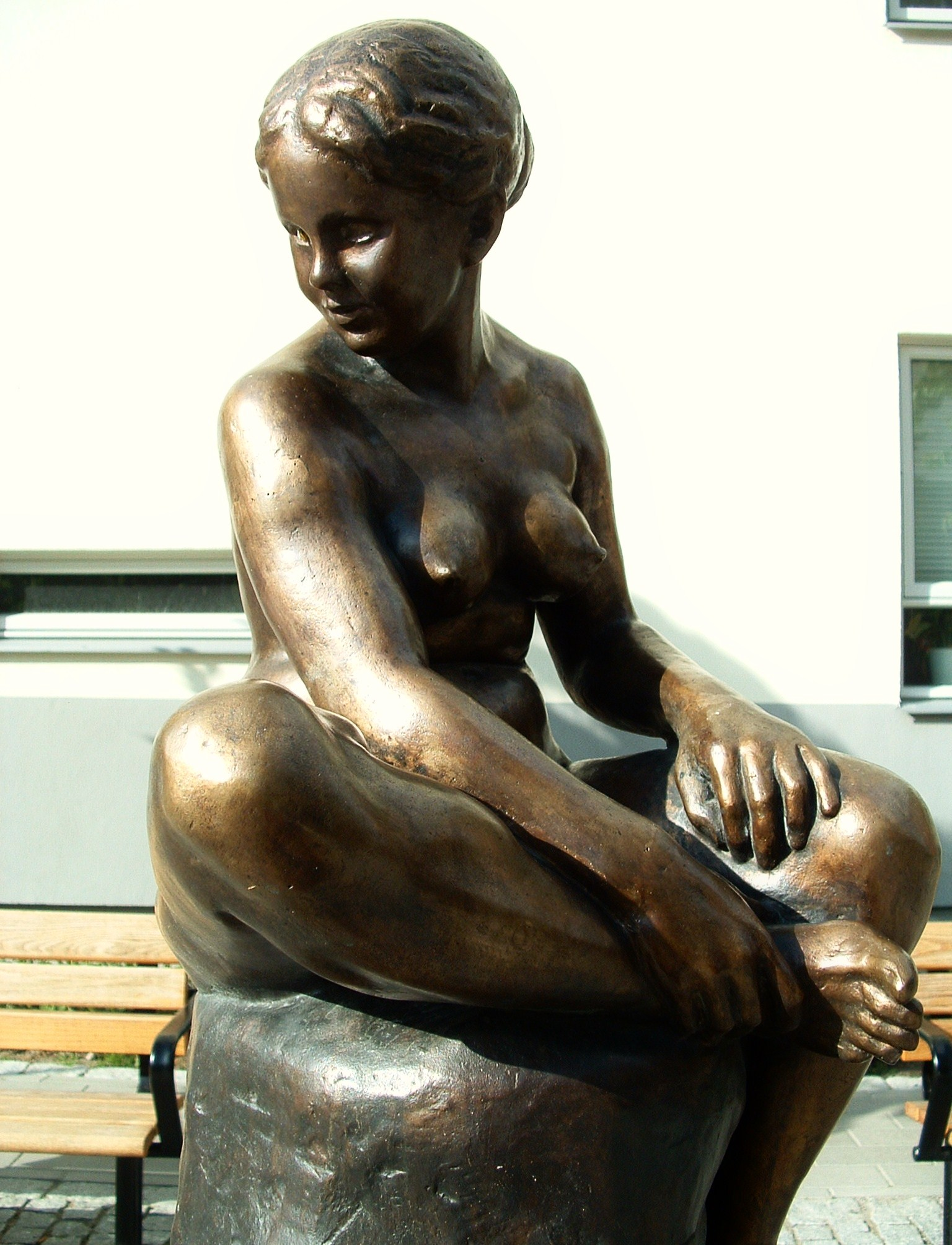
Sculpture in Filmstaden Råsunda

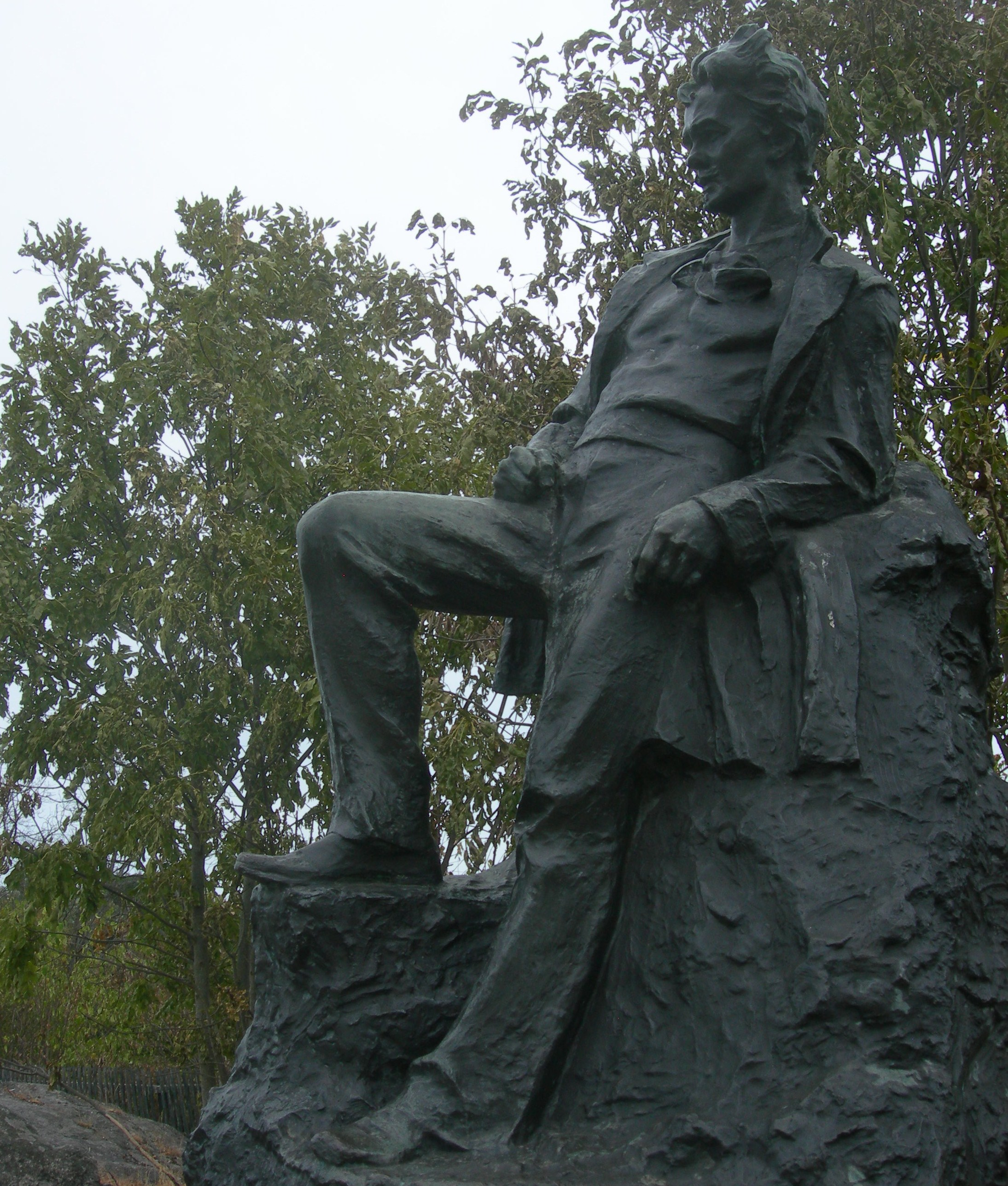
Strindberg statue in Bellevue

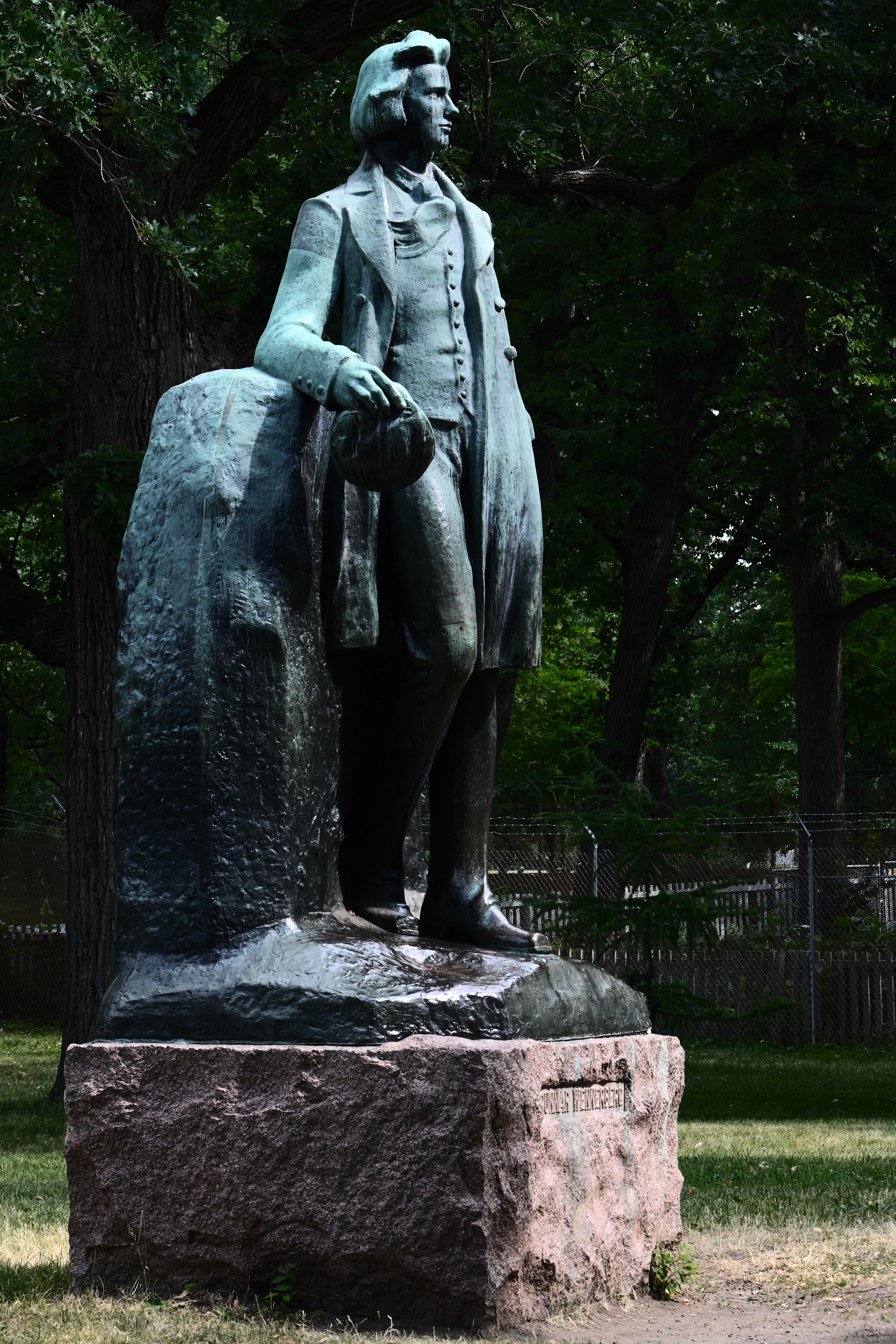
Statue of Gunnar Wennerberg in Minnehaha Park, Minneapolis

== Sources ==
- Åsa Cavalli-Björkman, Petra Gröminger: Carl Eldhs Ateljémuseum. Stiftelsen Carl och Elise Eldhs ateljé, Stockholm 2005, ISBN 9163172968
- Karl Asplund: Carl Eldh. Stockholm 1943
- Konstnärsförbundets årshäfte, 1904
- Sveriges Radio: Carl Eldhs statyer stulna på kyrkogården, 3 June 2014
