= Norr Mälarstrand =

Street in Kungsholmen, Stockholm, Sweden

Coordinates: 59°19′38″N 18°02′18″E

Norr Mälarstrand (Swedish for "Northern Shore of Mälaren") is a street on Kungsholmen in central Stockholm, Sweden. Bordering Riddarfjärden, the easternmost bay of Lake Mälaren, Norr Mälarstrand is a southbound boulevard stretching 1,4 km (4.500 ft) west from the Stockholm City Hall to the southern end of the street Sankt Eriksgatan. The most notable structures along the street are the series of functionalist residential buildings lined-up along its western part. The park facing the waterfront south of the street is popular for walks.

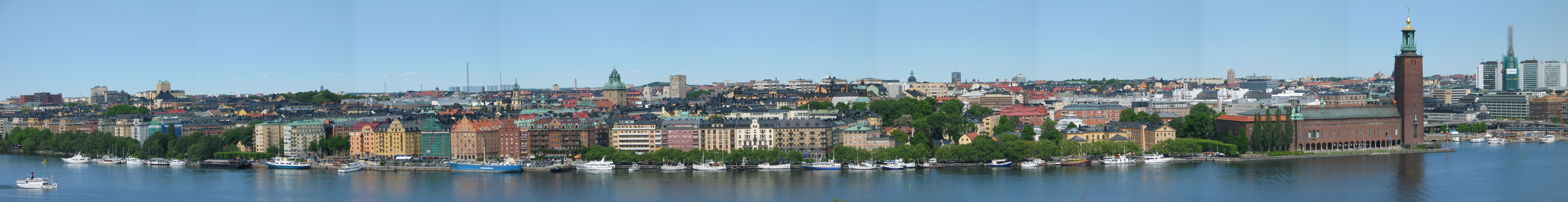
Panoramic view of Norr Mälarstrand with the functionalist residential buildings on the extreme left and the Stockholm City Hall on the right.

== History ==
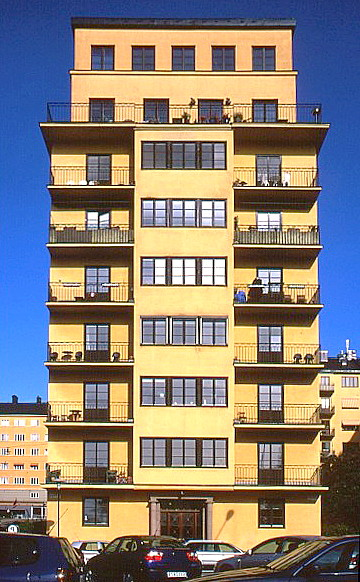
The exterior of 66, Norr Mälarstrand, the residence of explorer Sven Hedin 1935–52, is a characteristic example of the functionalist buildings. The entrance of the building, a colourful celebration to the explorer, is not, however.

A first proposal for a boulevard on the location in 1863–64, intended to embellish the area with a westbound entrance to the city similar to Strandvägen, the simultaneously proposed eastbound boulevard which, in contrast to the former, was actually built and became the grandiose front of the eastern district Östermalm. For Norr Mälarstrand, however, it would take another half-century before construction work on the Stockholm City Hall (1911–23) resulted in the urbanization of the area.

A garrison of engineers stationed along the shore prevented an extension of the street until they were relocated elsewhere in the early 1920s. By that time, new garden cities in the suburbs had resulted in an increasing need for new western approach into the city. In 1928 the city bought the land from the Crown and a plan for the area designed by Albert Lilienberg the same year was accepted in 1930. Stepped gables then present were removed and replaced by the evenly spaced functionalist silhouettes — the nine floors of which resulted in comparisons with cities in America and the epithet "Manhattan of Stockholm".

The traditional dark, enclosed city blocks were opened up south and made into public parks, inviting light, air, and people in. A park designed by Erik Glemme was realised south of the street which transformed the street into a modern "riverside drive". The park forms the first section of a series of parks stretching west across Kungsholmen — a style of urban parks known as the "Stockholm Style" (Stockholmsstilen) which was internationally acknowledge at the time. The buildings, most of them completed within two years, were adorned with characteristic Functionalist details, such as windows on corners, accentuated balconies, and flat roofs. Many of the buildings are, however, also adorned with classical details, including a building designed by architect Ragnar Östberg, an ambivalence which reflects the transition from the National Romantic Swedish architecture of the 1920s to the Functionalism introduced with the Stockholm Exhibition 1930.

Björn Hedvall, an architect who had realised the first Functionalist building on the street before 1930, is responsible for three of the southbound properties and more than a dozen of the other buildings in the blocks. On the John Ericssonsgatan street, architect Sven Markelius designed a radically new residential concept for collective accommodation. Influenced by the ideas of Alva and Gunnar Myrdal, the building, constructed 1934–35, featured small flats with many shared utilities throughout the building, including a food elevator bringing telephone-ordered dinners up from the restaurant on the ground floor; a chute for laundry; cleaning staff; and kindergartens. While this was one of the first such projects realised in Europe, a new concept which appealed to the radical intellectuals who settled there, the 50 apartments were served by 22 employees — a luxury few could afford.

== See also ==
- Västerbron
- Söder Mälarstrand
- Hammarby Sjöstad
