= Grennaskolan =

Coordinates: 58.0226°N 14.4689°E

Grennaskolan Boarding School
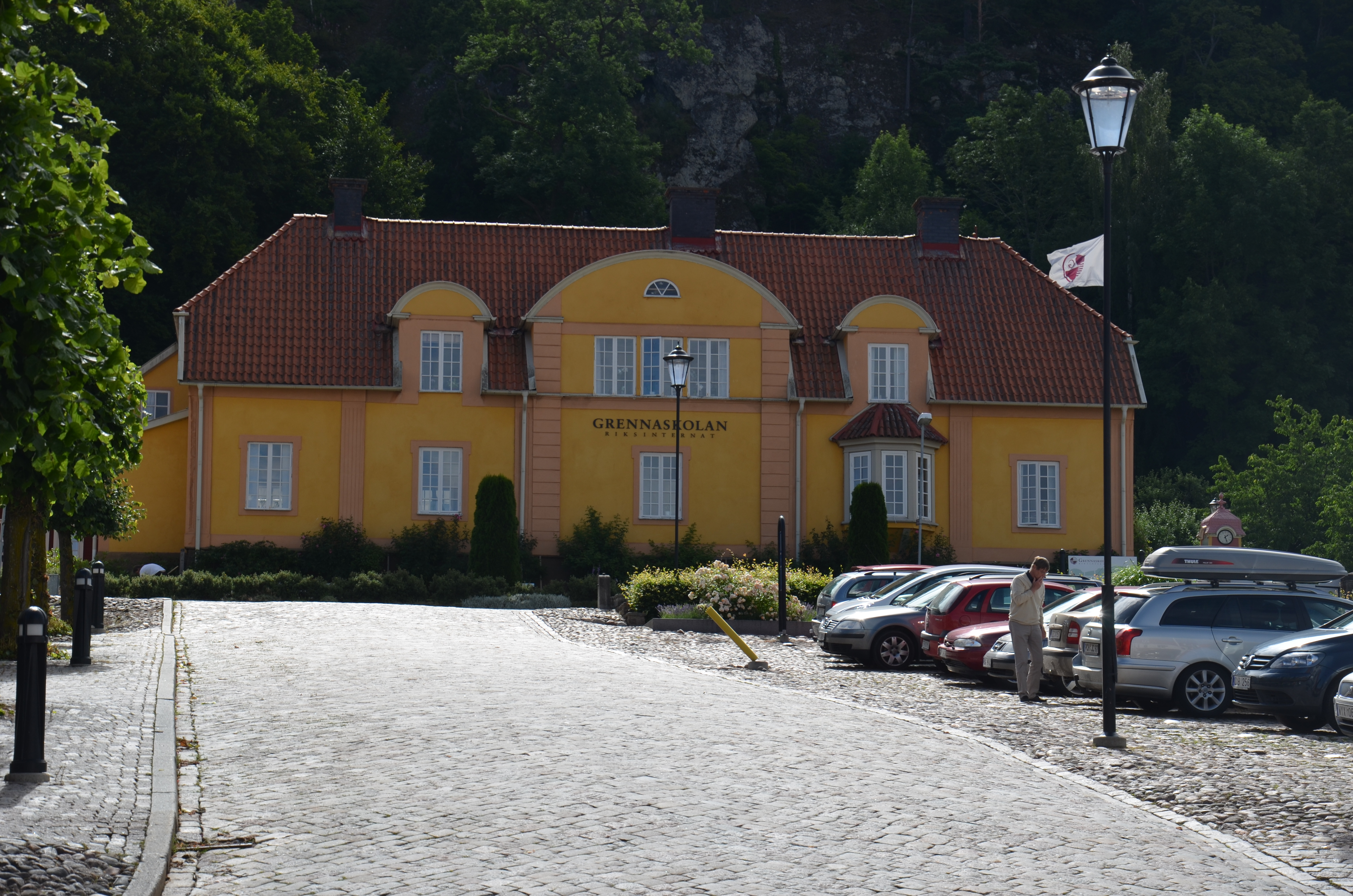

Information
- Type: Municipally owned
- Established: 1963; 62 years ago
- Founder: Stockholm University
- Closed: 2019; 6 years ago
- Headmaster: Jessika Humphreys
- Website: http://www.grennaskolan.se/

Grennaskolan Boarding School was a Swedish boarding school located in Gränna, Jönköping County. Grennaskolan Boarding School was founded in 1963 by Stockholm University and has today approximately 200 students, half of whom are boarding school students and half of whom are international students.

The boarding school was one of the three elite boarding schools in Sweden, the others being Sigtunaskolan Humanistiska Läroverket and Lundsbergs Boarding School. Grennaskolan Boarding School AB was a wholly owned subsidiary of Rådhuset AB, which is fully owned by Jönköping Municipality.

== Education ==
The school offered the IB Middle Years Programme from grades 7-9. The high school offered both Swedish and English programs. Students of the Swedish program focused either on humanities or science and mathematics, while the English-speaking programme was the International Baccalaureate.

== Boarding ==
Overall, half of the students were boarding students.

=== Boardings houses for boys ===
- Postiljonen Norra
- Vulkanen

=== Boardings houses for girls ===
- Grevégården
- Postiljonen Södra

== History ==
The school was found in 1963 and the first students graduated from the school in 1965 after 2.5 years of study.

- 1968 - Grennaskolan opens its first foreign schools in Brighton, and a year later in Aix-en-Provence and Landshut.
- 1970 - Grennaskolan participates in the first official International Baccalaureate or IB exam in 1970 along with ten other international schools from e.g. New York, Paris, Frankfurt and Geneve. However, apart from 1970, Grennaskolan does not proceed to offer the IB program until 1995.
- 1970 - Grennaskolan becomes one of only three elite boarding schools in Sweden.
- 1974 - Grennaskolan closes its foreign schools due to abolished student grants for foreign students.
- 1978 - Jönköping Municipality is now responsible for the school.
- 1988 - Grennaskolan starts its MYP program from grades 7-9.
- 1995 - Grennaskolan is now spelled with an "e". The International Baccalaureate Diploma Programme, IB, with all instruction in English starts.
- 1997 - Grennaskolan Riksinternat AB becomes a fully owned subsidiary of Jönköping Municipality.

The school celebrated their 50th anniversary in 2013.

Grennaskolan was permanently closed in 2019.

== Alumni ==
- Urban Bäckström, CEO of Confederation of Swedish Enterprise and former Governor of Sveriges Riksbank
- Ulf Wagner, chef
- Rickard Sjöberg, journalist & TV-personality
- Katerina Janouch, sexologist
- Alexander Chikwanda, Finance Minister of Zambia
