= Bestorp =

- Location within Östergötland Location within Sweden
- Coordinates: 58°14′N 15°44′E
- Country: Sweden
- Province: Östergötland
- County: Östergötland County
- Municipality: Linköping Municipality

Area
  - Total: 0.53 km^{2} (0.20 sq mi)

Population (31 December 2020)
  - Total: 513
  - Density: 970/km^{2} (2,500/sq mi)
- Time zone: UTC+1 (CET)
  - Summer (DST): UTC+2 (CEST)

Bestorp is a locality situated in Linköping Municipality, Östergötland County, Sweden with 475 inhabitants in 2010.
