= Kurlander =

Kurlander is a surname. Notable people with the surname include:

- Carl Kurlander, American television writer.
- Eric Kurlander, professor of history at Stetson University.
- David J Kurlander, Animal Behavior Specialist and Wild Animal Researcher. Worked for the Wildlife Conservation Society at the Bronx Zoo in the capacity of a Wild Animal Keeper with focus on Animal Behavior (Canine), Host of The Pack Animal Podcast on Apple iTunes and owner of Steady Wind, LLC.
