= Tiantian Kullander =

Swedish Chinese entrepreneur

Tiantian Kullander (1992–2022), also known as TT, was a Swedish-Chinese entrepreneur and investor. He was the co-founder of Amber Group, a unicorn digital asset services company. He served on many boards of successful companies and was well known as a pioneer in the crypto De-Fi industry.

== Early life and education ==
Tiantian Kullander was born on 14 July 1992 in Beijing, the son of Swedish-Chinese Ichthyologist Fang Fang Kullander from her first marriage in China. Tiantian moved to Stockholm Sweden with his family in 1994, where he attended Enskilda Gymnasiet in Stockholm.

Following high school, Tiantian attended Durham University in the United Kingdom 2010–2013, where he studied Finance and graduated with a first-class honors degree.

During his time at Durham, he was President of the Durham University Finance Society and was awarded the Academic Achievement Award and the Vice-Chancellor's Scholarship for Academic Excellence.

== Career ==
Tiantian started his career in 2013 as a credit trader in the Fixed Income division of Morgan Stanley, Hong Kong. Prior to this, he completed internships in the London offices of Jefferies and Goldman Sachs in 2011 and 2012, respectively.

Tiantian founded Amber Group along with his co-founders in 2018. Amber Group is a leader in digital asset trading, products, and infrastructure. The company works with a variety of companies, including token issuers, banks and fintech firms, as well as sports teams, game developers, brands, and creators. At the time of his death, the company was valued at US$3 billion.

Besides co-founding Amber and building it into a multi-billion-dollar fintech unicorn, TT sat on the Board of Fnatic (one of the world's most successful e-sports organizations) and founded KeeperDAO (the first on-chain liquidity underwriter) before giving it back to its community.

In 2019, at age 27, Tiantian was listed in the Forbes 30 under 30 for his professional achievements.

== Personal life ==
Tiantian married Monica Qian in April 2021 in Hong Kong. They have one son together.

On 23 November 2022, TT died unexpectedly during sleep.

He was a ski instructor during his school holidays as a teenager and was captain of his college basketball team during his time at Durham University (2010 – 2012). He was also enthusiastic about powerlifting, music production, chess, scuba diving, and had travelled to over 20 countries with his wife.

Tiantian's parents Sven and Fang discovered Pethia Tiantian in 2005, the fish was named after Tiantian, it inhabits streams at the foot of the Himalayas, "that is, somewhat close to heaven".
