= Osvald Almqvist =

Swedish architect

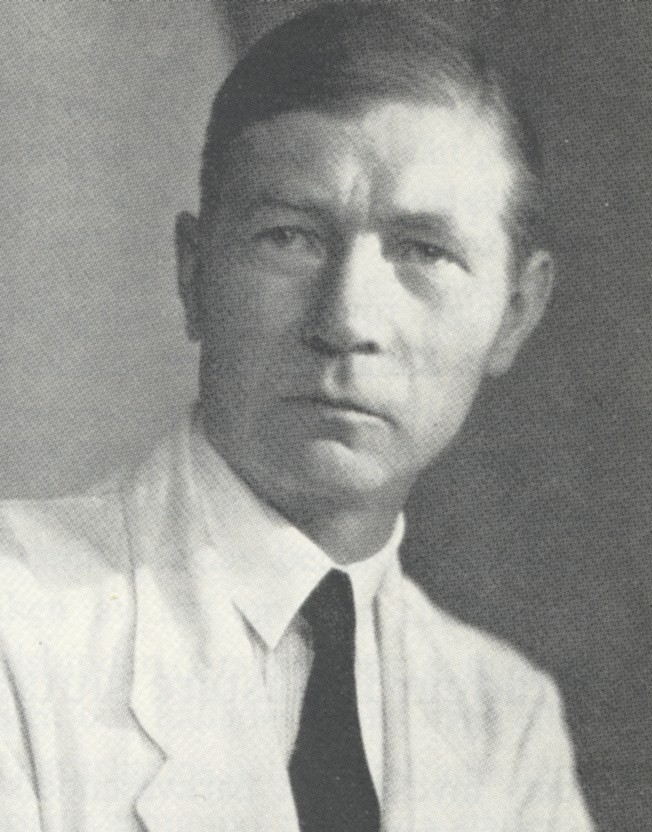
Osvald Almqvist in 1936

Osvald Almqvist (1884–1950) was a Swedish architect, who was one of the pioneers of functionalism in Swedish architecture. His designs include those for hydro-electric power stations at Forshuvudfors (1917–21), Hammarfors (1925-28) and Krångfors (1925–28). Between 1939 and 1938, Almqvist was in charge of the Stockholm Parks Department.

== Biography ==
In 1904, Almqvist became a student at the Royal Institute of Technology in Stockholm, and in 1908 he received a diploma in architecture. After graduation, he traveled abroad, then returned and continued his studies at the Royal Academy of Arts from 1909 to 1910. After graduation, he worked as an architect in Stockholm from 1910 to 1916. Among other things, he worked together with Gustav Lindén under the supervision of architect Ivar Tengbom. From 1911 to 1913, he worked in the Stockholm Building Department; from 1916 to 1920, he was the head of the architectural bureau of Stora Kopparbergs Bergslags AB in Burlänge. During this time, he developed a plan for the city (which was not formally recognized) and buildings in the residential district of Bergslasbyn. He was also an employee of the Committee for Minimum Social Housing Credits in 1921.

Following this investigation, Almqvist was commissioned to draw up a standard for kitchen joinery. Starting from the premise that human dimensions should be the basis, the researchers conducted a large study to measure how the kitchen workplace should be designed to facilitate work, and Almqvist developed standardized units for cabinets, shelves, and benches that could be combined with each other in different ways. His work would form the basis of the activities of the Home Research Institute in the 1940s, which in 1950, became the first Swedish kitchen standard. In 1925, he became an architect at the Swedish National Building Board.

Between 1936 and 1938, Almqvist was a city gardener in Stockholm. In his program declaration, he stated that in urban and regional planning, it is essential to ensure that continuous park paths with pedestrian, horseback and bicycle paths, public playgrounds, exercise and sports fields and, further out, forest parks and nature reserves could be created for outdoor recreation in both summer and winter.

He was the first to carefully study how roads should be laid out in the terrain and how people should be guided to the different parts of the park. During his short time as Stockholm's city gardener, he developed planning ideas to guide the design of the city's parks for a long time. According to Almqvist's program statement, the first parks were Fredhällsparken and Rålambshovsparken, both on Kungsholmen. In 1938, Almqvist wanted to be dismissed from his position, and he was replaced by Holger Blom, also a trained architect. In 1940-48, Almqvist was an urban planner in Södertälje.
