= Sigrid Fridman =

Swedish sculptor (1879–1963)

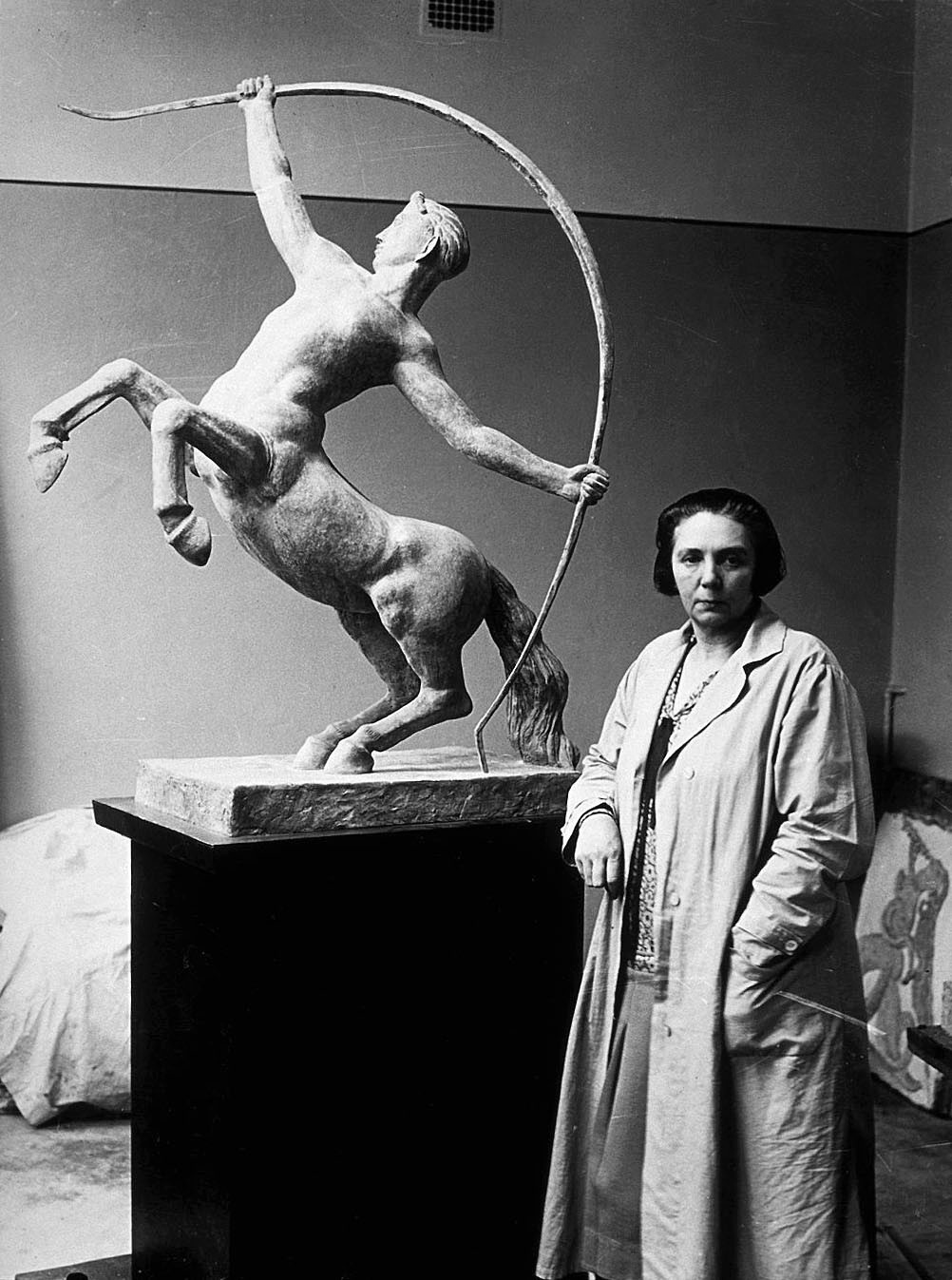
- Born: Sigrid Carolina Sofia Fridman; 23 November 1879; Haparanda, Sweden
- Died: 8 January 1963 (aged 83); Stockholm, Sweden
- Occupation: sculptor
- Years active: 1911–1963
- Known for: Centaur, sculpture at Observatorielunden in Stockholm

Sigrid Carolina Sofia Fridman (23 November 1879 – 8 January 1963) was a Swedish sculptor most known for her works of women and the Centaur sculpture which is located in the park known as Observatorielunden in Stockholm. Many of her sculptures are located in public parks throughout the country.

== Early life ==
Sigrid Carolina Sofia Fridman was born on 23 November 1879 in the Haparanda Municipality of Norrbotten County, Sweden to Mathilda Kristina (née Bruhn) and Karl Gustaf Fridman. She attended Arvedson's Gymnastics Institute (sv), in Stockholm, a school designed in 1902 to teach women the skills of physiotherapy.

== Career ==
Moving to London after her graduation, Fridman began working as a physical therapist. As a hobby, she began studying sculpting in a private studio around 1911. In 1912, she moved to Paris to focus on her art and enrolled at the Académie de la Grande Chaumière, under the tutelage of Antoine Bourdelle. After studying in Paris for four years, in 1916, she exhibited in the London Spring Exhibition of the Grosvenor Gallery. From around 1914, Fridman was involved in a relationship with the artist Ragnhild Barkman.

Fridman returned to Sweden and settled in Gothenburg, producing a series of decorative works. She was commissioned by the Swedish seafaring company Atlantica in 1921 to create two statues for their new building. She produced Sea Horse (Swedish: Havshästen) and Walrus (Swedish: Valrossen), both in black granite. In the same period, she sculpted another piece of black granite known as Penguin's Well (Swedish: Pingvinbrunnen), which is now located on the grounds of the Swedish Museum of Natural History. Other known pieces from her Göteborg period include Fauns (Swedish: Faunerna), Skipping youth (Swedish: Hukande yngling) and a bust of Torgny Segerstedt.

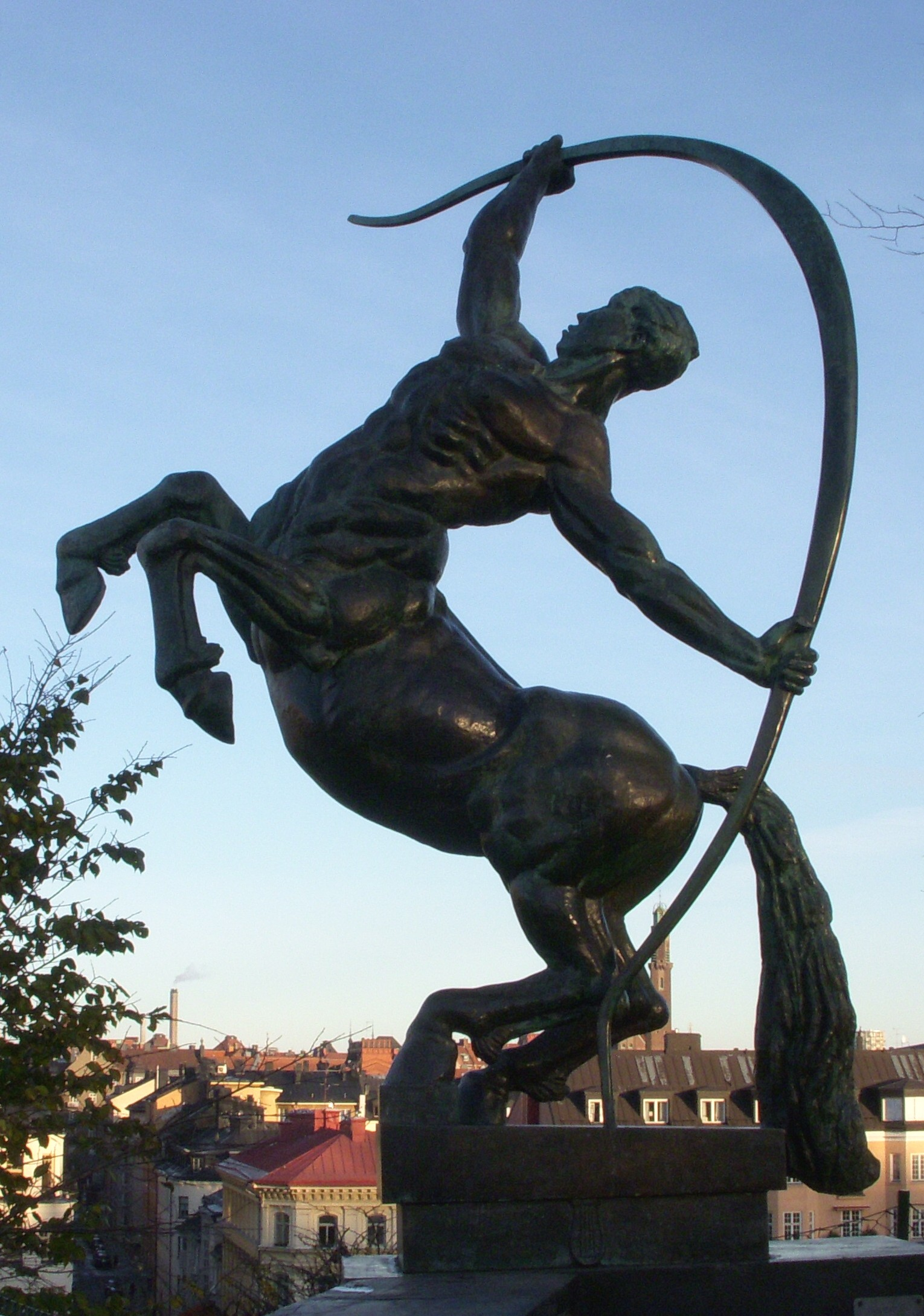
Centaur

Around 1924, Fridman and Barkman moved to Stockholm and became friends with another lesbian couple, Klara Johanson and Ellen Kleman. They spent time together until Johanson's death in 1948, often taking summer trips together to Rättvik and Masesgården. On one study trip to Greece, Fridman and Johanson became romantically involved, though neither left their long-term partners. In 1927, Fridman created a sculpture of Fredrika Bremer, which caused controversy about whether a woman should be engaged as a serious sculptor. This debate continued, with many male colleagues taking the position that women should only sculpt children's portraits or small pieces that depicted femininity, when in 1928, Fridman proposed her Centaur statue.

Fridman's work Centaur became her most noted piece. Completed in 1939, angry controversy surrounded it as well, with many complaining that the figure was not culturally sensitive, as centaurs were not part of the national folklore. The statue, in bronze is unadorned and reflects the power of the creature in its strong composition. Though initially Fridman intended the sculpture to be displayed at the beginning of Library Street, it was installed on the hill near the observatory in Observatorielunden in Stockholm. In 1948, Johanson published a book in defense of Fridman and other women artists, Sigrid Fridman—och andra konstnärer: en krigskrönika (Sigrid Fridman—and other artists: a war chronicle).

Fridman's statue of Ellen Key (1953) was also the subject of fierce debate, and as the artist aged, she became more introverted, though she continued to work. Various pieces of her sculpture are scattered throughout the country in public spaces, such as variant centaurs in Örebro and Bollnäs, a figure of Pan with pipes in Härlanda and a fountain in the garden of Villa Muramaris near Visby in Gotland. Her last work, Det droppande trädet (The Dripping Tree) is located in Odengatan near the City Library and was installed the year after her death.

== Death and legacy ==
Fridman died on 8 January 1963 in Stockholm County, Sweden.

== Gallery ==
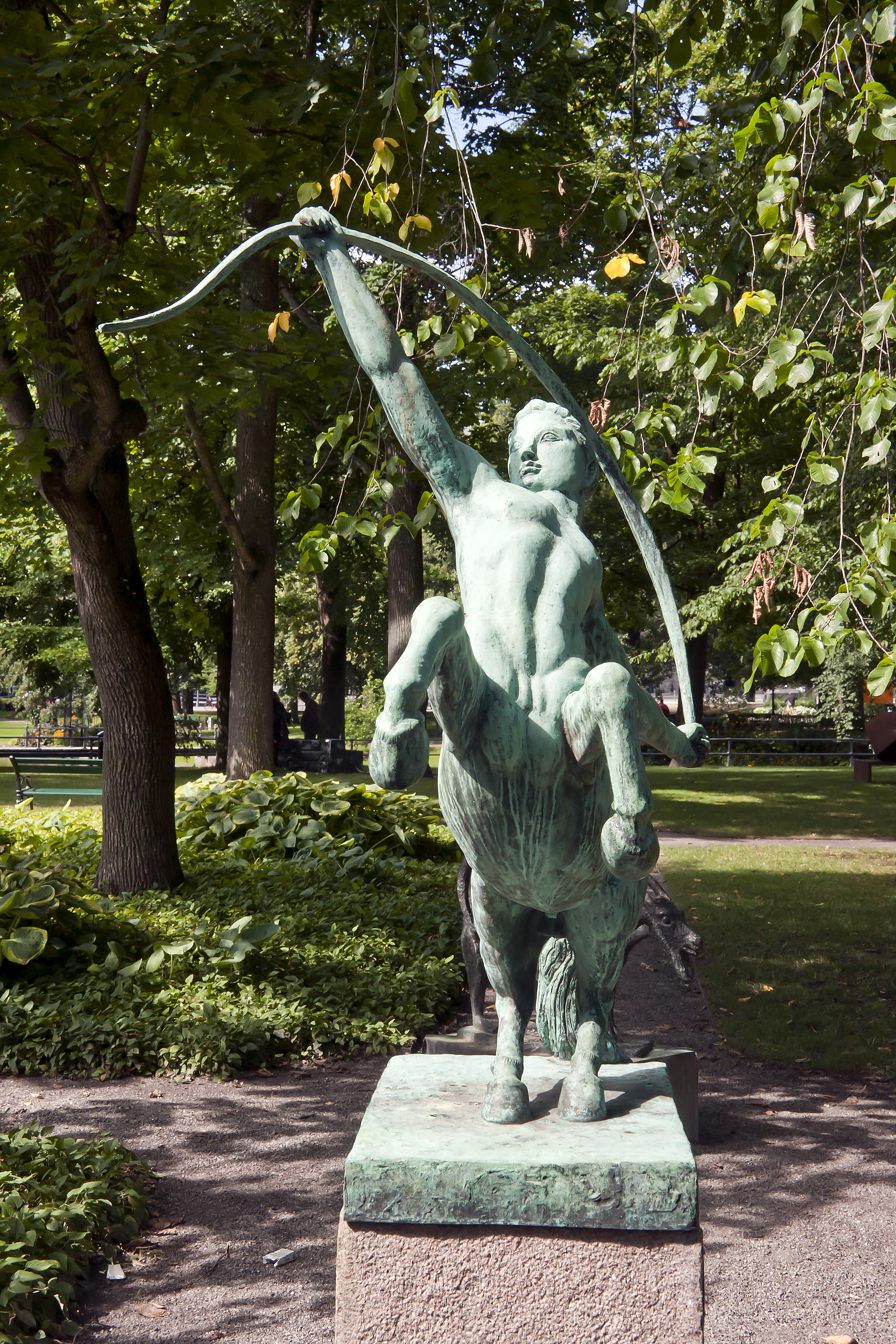
Örebro centaur

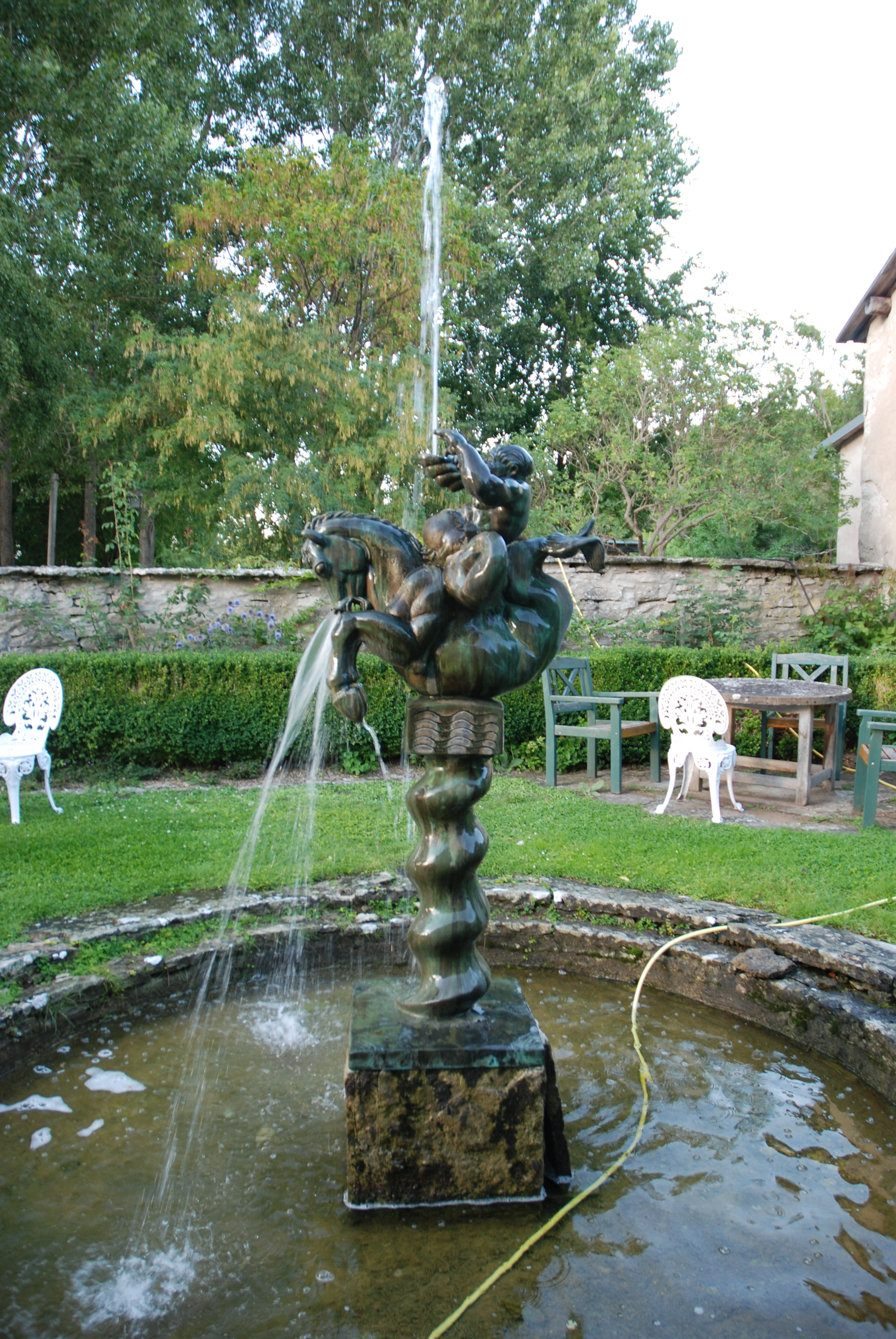
Muramaris Fountain

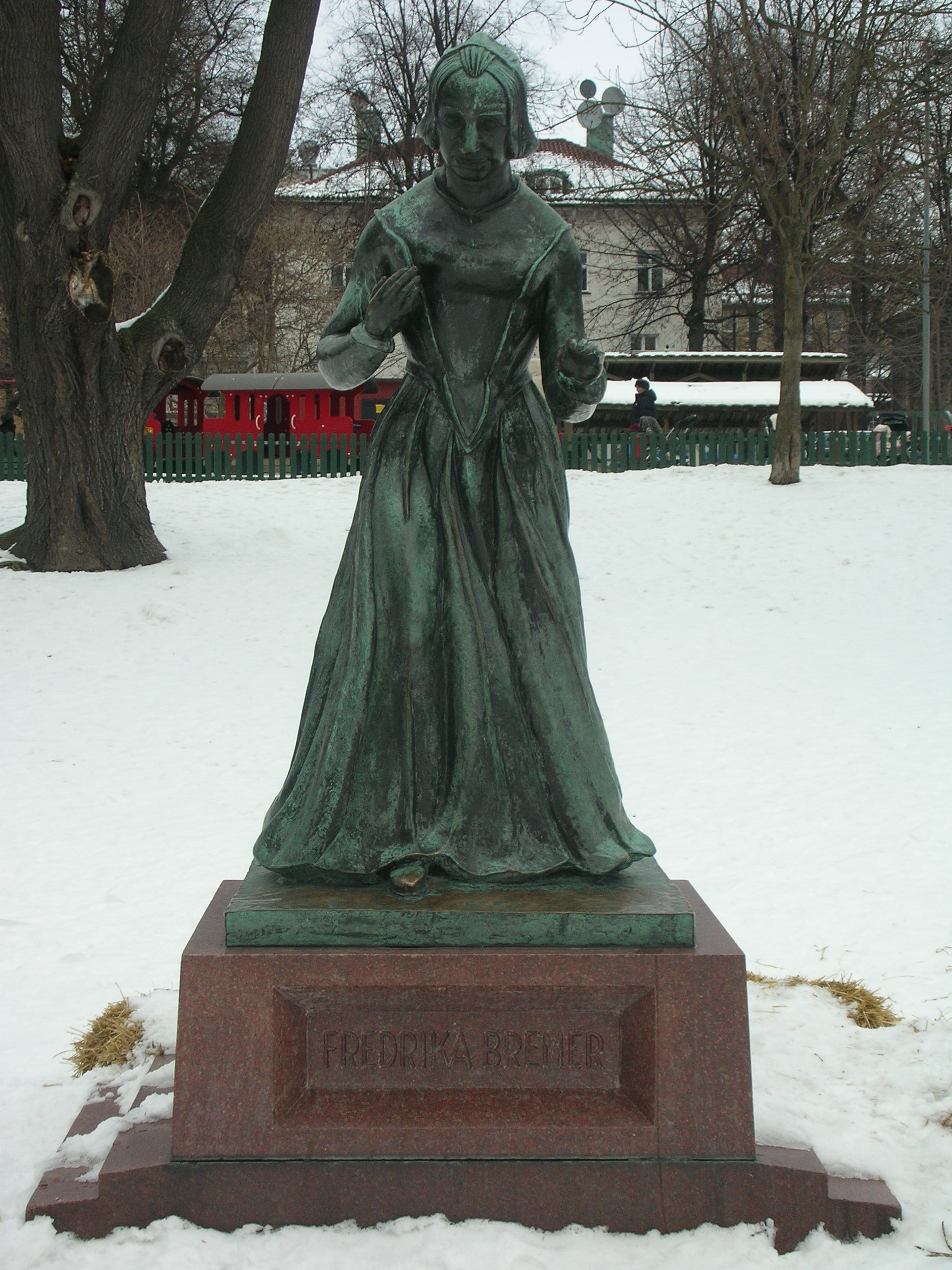
Fredrika Bremer

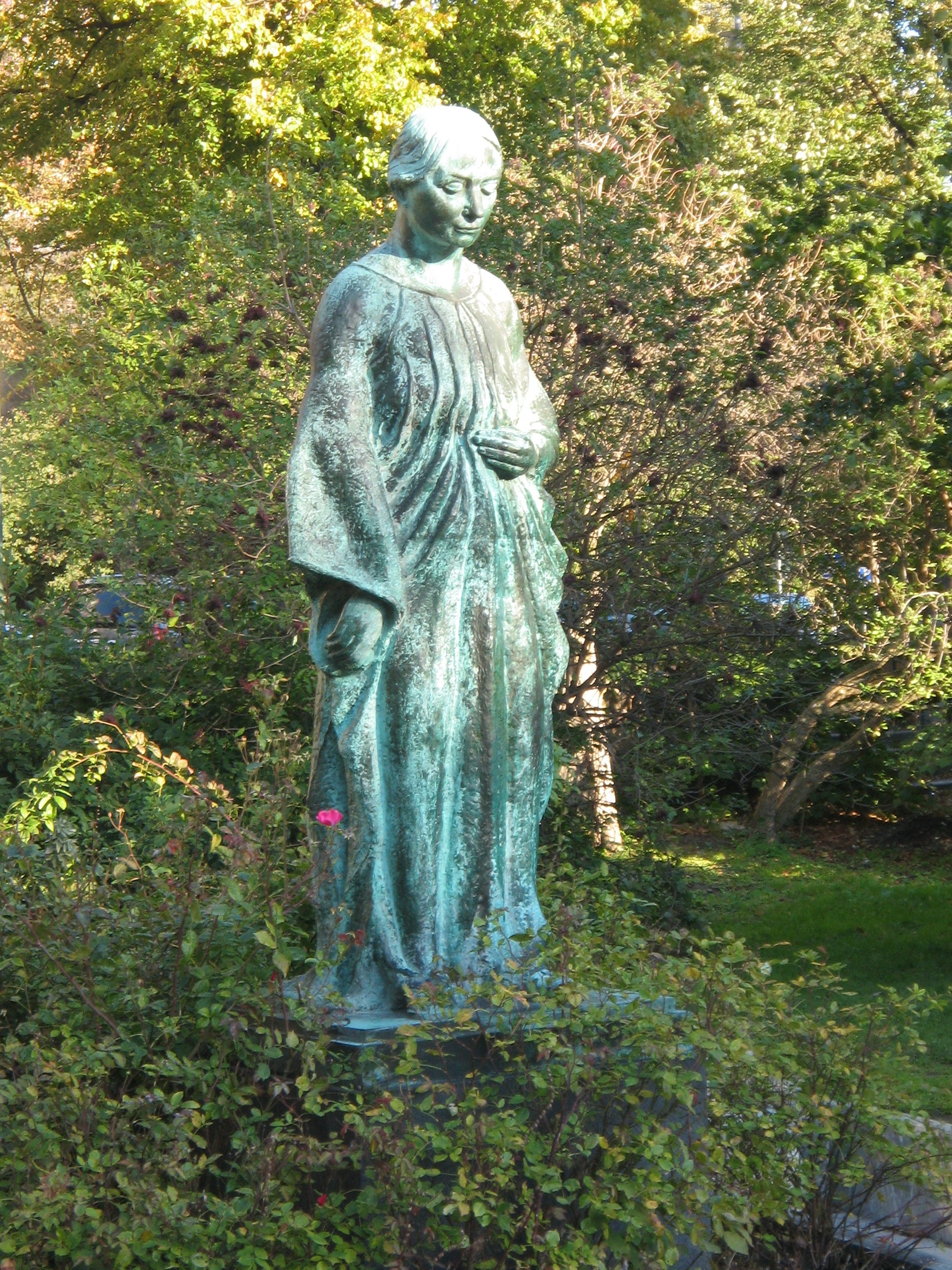
Ellen Key

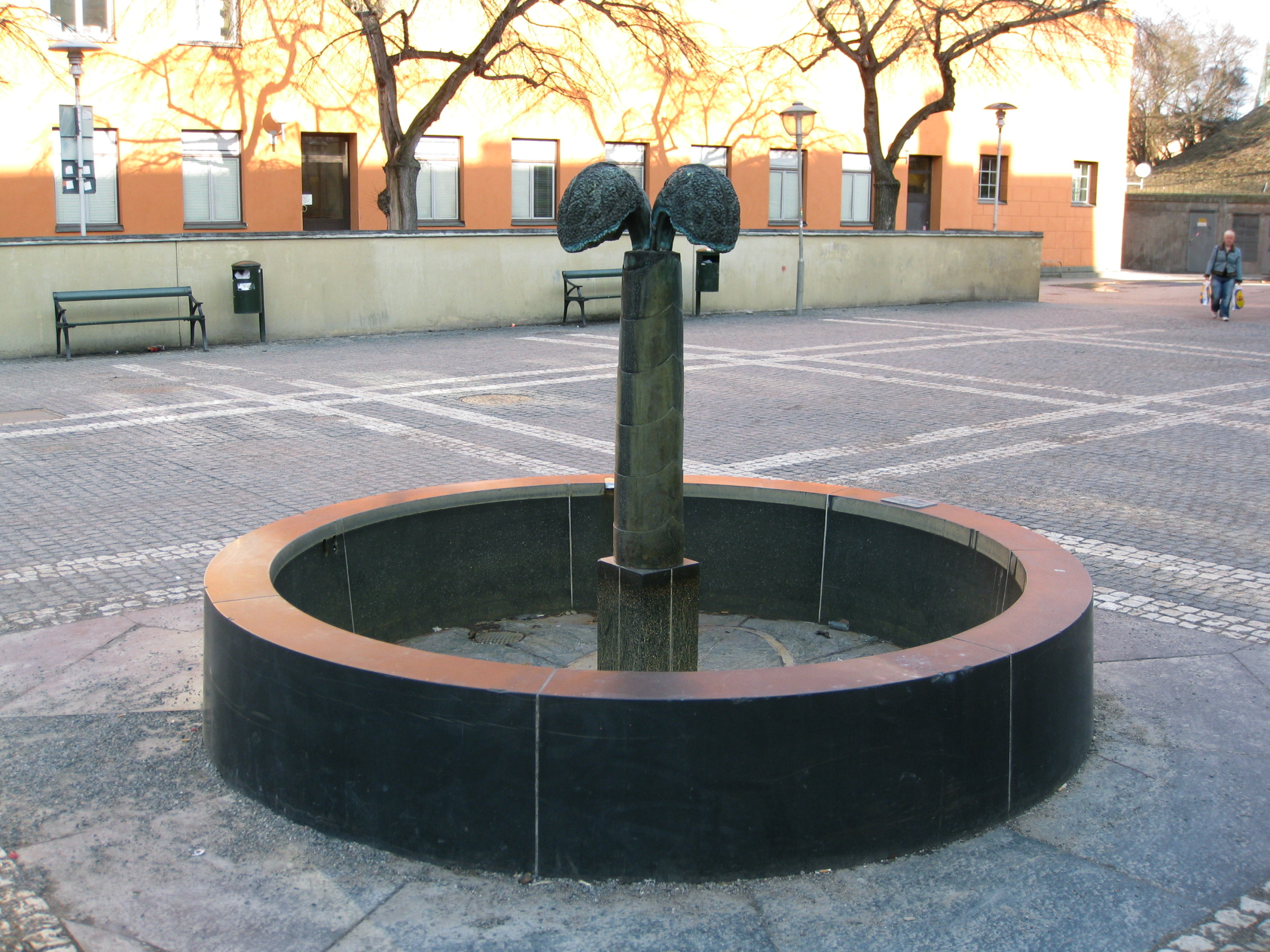
The Dripping Tree
