= Brunkebergsåsen =

Coordinates: 59°20′17″N 18°03′51″E

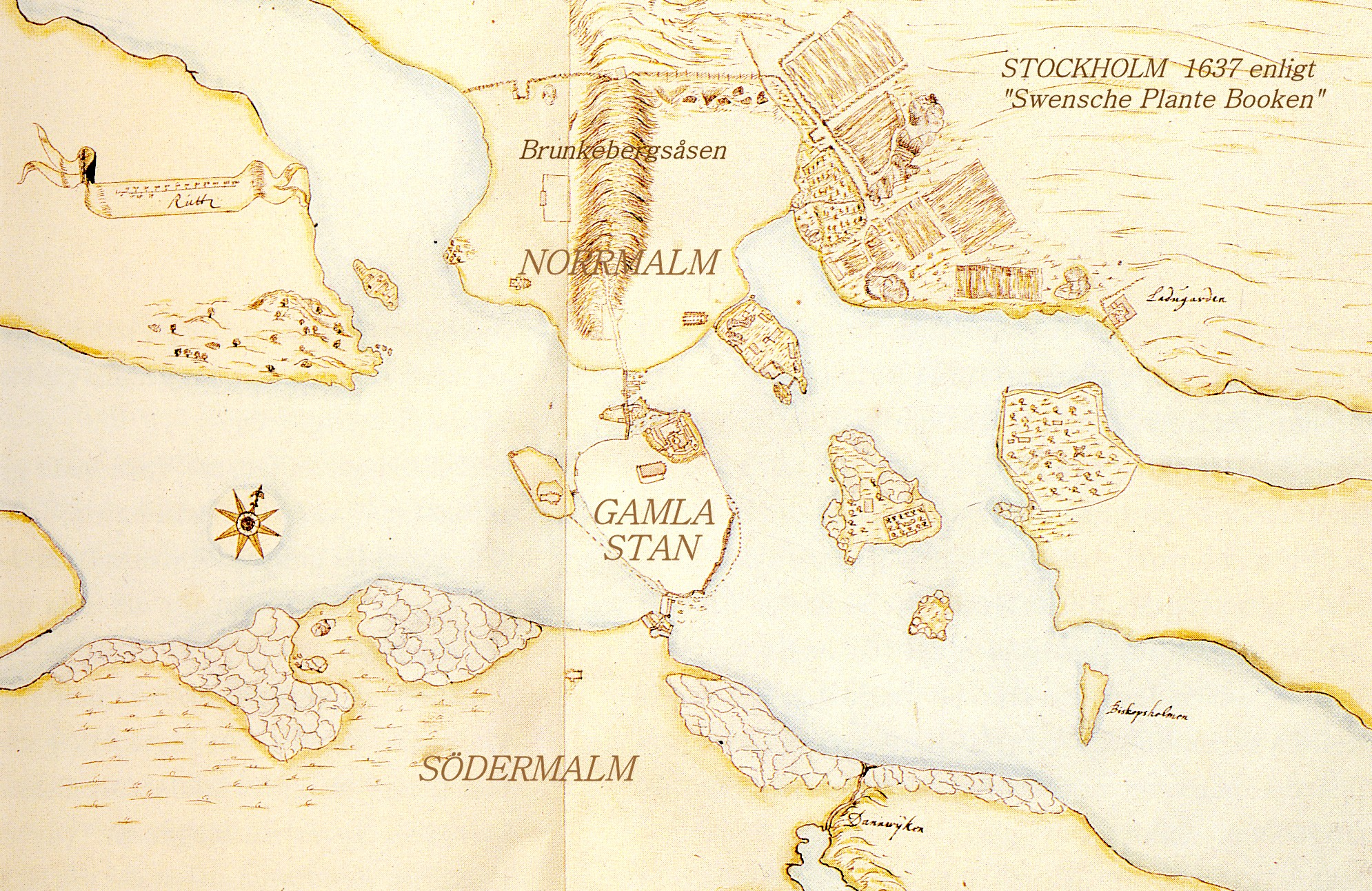
Brunkebergsåsen on a Stockholm map of 1637

Brunkebergsåsen was an esker that once reached over much of Stockholm's Norrmalm district. Geologically, it is a part of the much larger Stockholmsåsen. It formed a considerable obstacle to traffic, effectively dividing Norrmalm into a western and an eastern part. Consequently, most of it has been dug away over the centuries to make room for the development of that district. The pedestrian tunnel Brunkebergstunneln and, since the 1910s, the eastern part of Kungsgatan cut through Brunkebergsåsen's southern part. Conspicuous remnants of the esker can be seen in the vicinity of Johannes kyrka, at Observatorielunden, and Vanadislunden.

== See also ==
- Battle of Brunkeberg
