= Odengatan =

Street in Stockholm, Sweden

Coordinates: 59°20′48.2″N 18°3′59″E

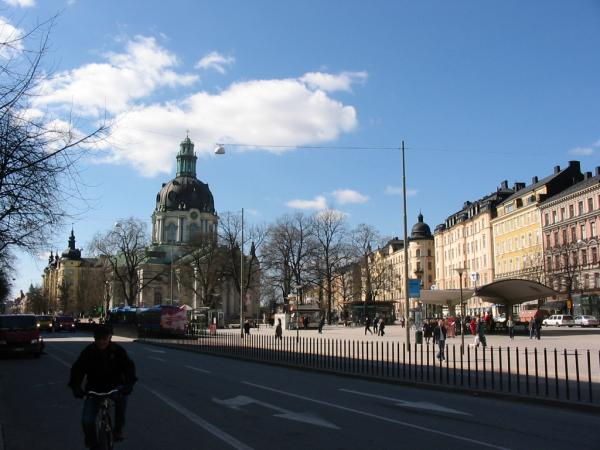
Odengatan with Odenplan and Gustaf Vasa Church in the background

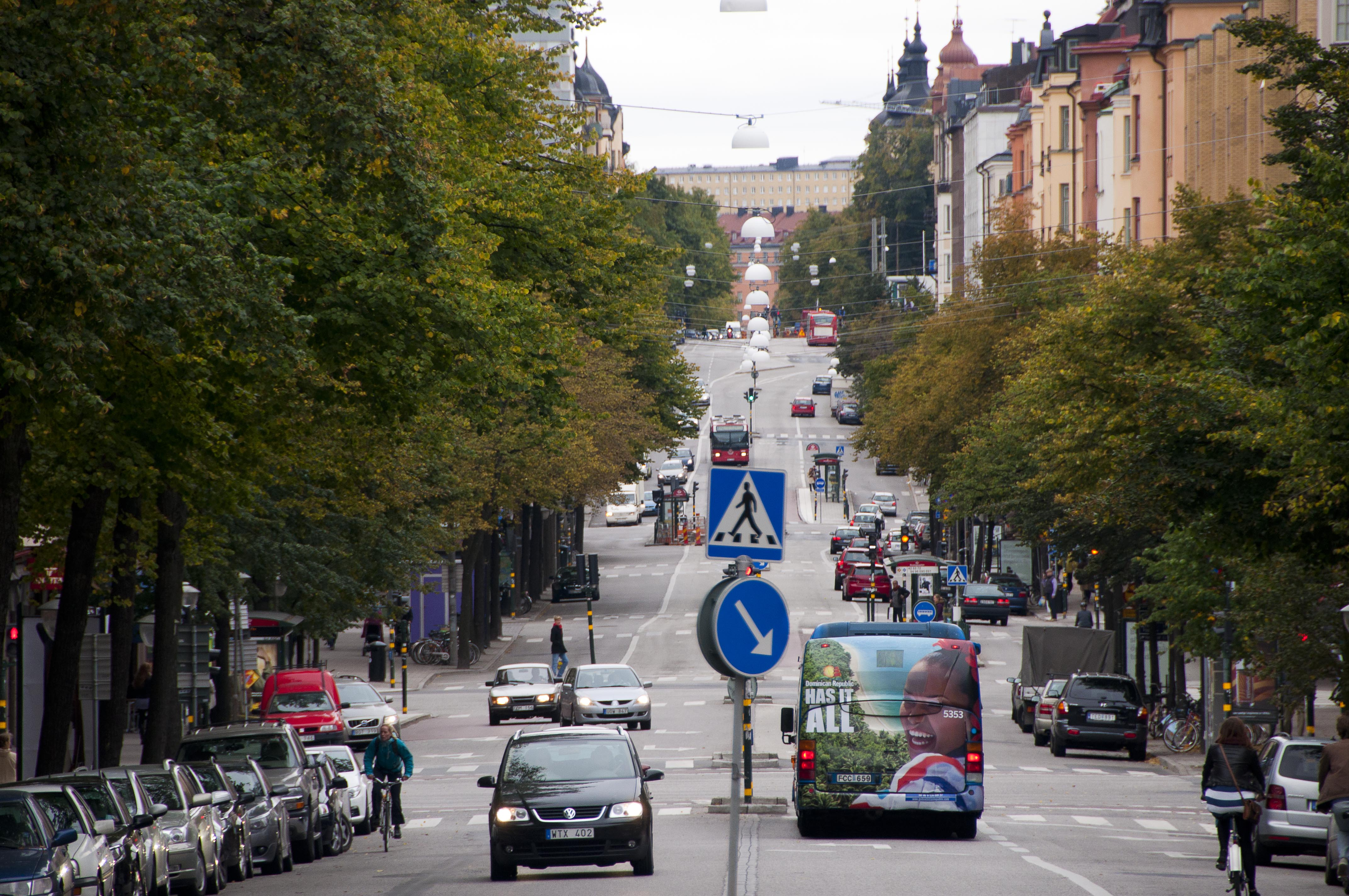
Odengatan, view from the east.

Odengatan is a major street in the districts Vasastan and Östermalm in central Stockholm.

It is connected to Vallhallavägen, from where it passes Stockholm Public Library, Odenplan, Gustaf Vasa Church and Vasaparken up to S:t Eriksplan. The street's width is about 30 metres and its length is about 1850 metres.

== Buildings at Odengatan ==
- Stockholm Public Library
- Gustaf Vasa Church
- Latvian Embassy

== See also ==
- Geography of Stockholm
