= Agi Lindegren =

Swedish architect and illustrator

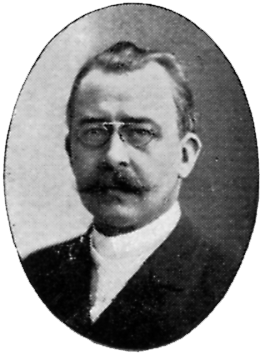
- Born: August Lindegren; December 29, 1858; Hudiksvall, Gävleborg County, Sweden
- Died: November 16, 1927 (aged 68)
- Education: KTH Royal Institute of Technology; Royal Swedish Academy of Fine Arts
- Occupations: Architect, illustrator

August "Agi" Lindegren (December 29, 1858 – 16 November 1927) was a Swedish architect and illustrator.

== Biography ==
Lindegren was born at Hudiksvall in Gävleborg County, Sweden. He studied at the KTH Royal Institute of Technology in Stockholm in 1877-82 and at the Royal Swedish Academy of Fine Arts in Stockholm in 1882–85. He then traveled to France, Germany and Italy for various periods over four years. In 1885, Lindegren became an architect at the Swedish government agency for the administration of state buildings (Överintendentsämbetet (sv)). In 1894, he was appointed architect at Drottningholm Palace.

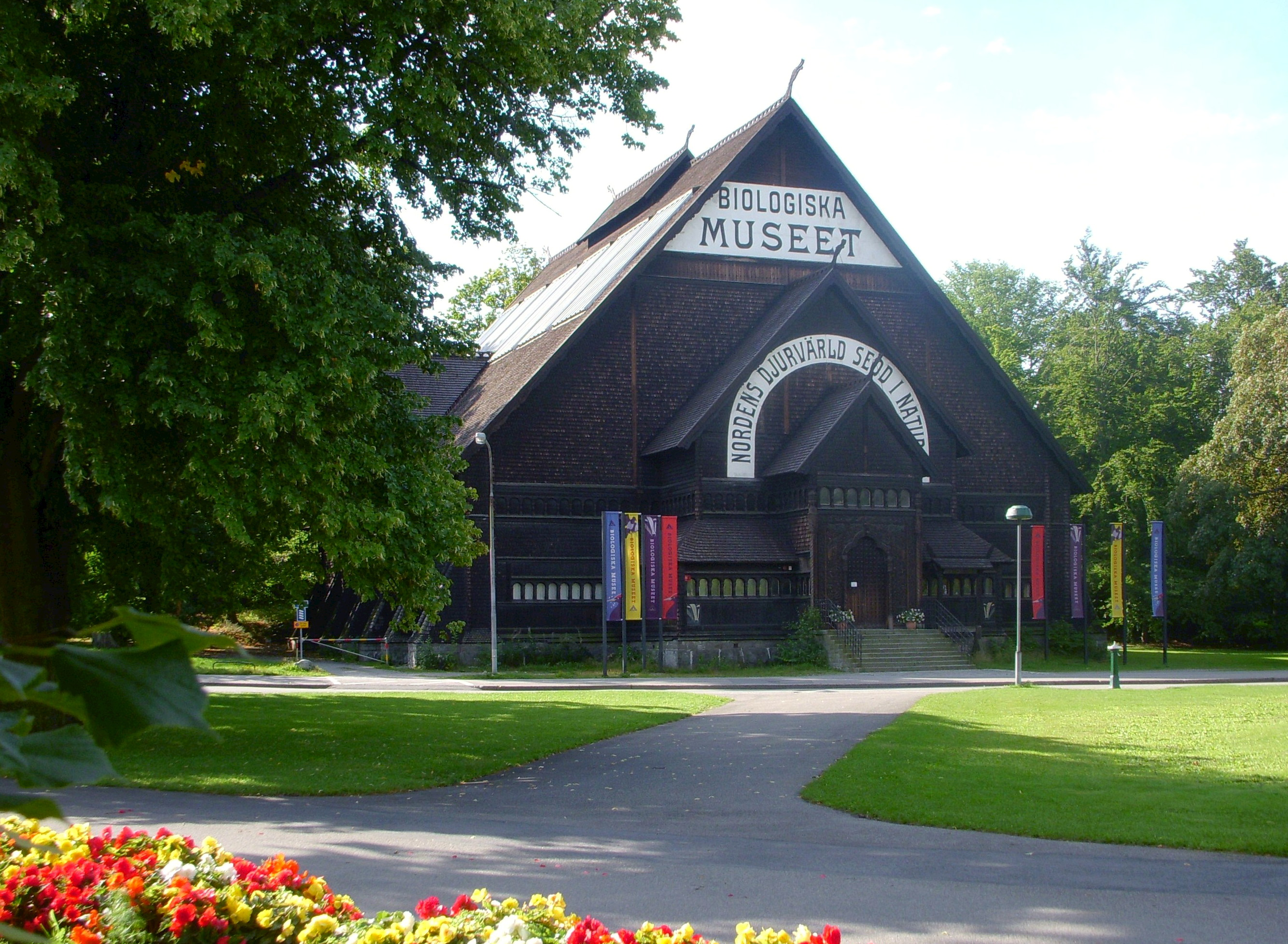
Biologiska museet, Stockholm

Among his designs were Biological Museum (Biologiska museet) at Djurgården in Stockholm (1893), Gustaf Vasa Church (Gustaf Vasa kyrka) in the Vasastaden district of Stockholm (1906) and New Church (Ny kyrka) in Värmland (1887-1889). Renovations included Västerås Cathedral (Västerås domkyrka) in Värmland (1896–98) and St. Mary's Church, Sigtuna (1904-05).
