= Sigrid Elmblad =

Swedish writer and translator

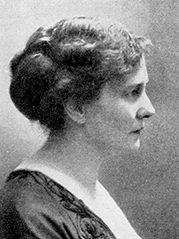
- Born: Sigrid Agneta Sofia Pettersson; 28 May 1860; Stockholm, Sweden
- Died: 23 March 1926 (aged 65); Stockholm, Sweden
- Writing career
- Pen name: Toivo
- Language: Swedish
- Genres: Biography, fiction for adults and children, poetry

Sigrid Agneta Sofia Elmblad, born Sigrid Agneta Sofia Pettersson, (28 May 1860 – 23 May 1926) was a Swedish journalist, poet, translator and writer, who translated Der Ring des Nibelungen (The Ring of the Nibelung) into Swedish and produced the first Swedish translation of the song of Saint Lucy. she produced her first poems under the pseudonym Toivo. Born in Stockholm to a Swedish father and Finnish mother, she was an early member of the Nya Idun society, rising to be chair between 1918 and 1921. After working as a journalist for the newspaper Dagens Nyheter, she travelled extensively with her husband, the opera singer Johannes Elmblad. While living in Bayreuth, she developed her interest in the music of Richard Wagner, which led her to translate his works into Swedish, including Parsifal in 1917, and the work of other German composers like Robert Schumann. She also wrote fiction for adults and children, as well as biographies for figures like Jenny Lind in 1920. She died in Sweden six years later.

== Biography ==
Elmblad was born in Stockholm on 28 May 1860, the daughter of architect Abraham Raphael Ulric Pettersson and Elma Edvina Rosalie. Her mother, known as Rosa, was Finnish and was the daughter of the prime-minister Carl Edvard af Heurlin. Her writing debut in the early 1880s was as a poet under the pseudonym Toivo, under which nme she produced poems for many literary poem calendars. In 1885, she joined the newly created society Nya Idun, through which she met many of the leading creative women of the time, including Ellen Fries and Sigrid Fridman. It was in 1885 that she also produced her first collection of poetry, Vind för Våg: Dikter och Skisser (Wind and Waves: Poems and Sketches). Two years later, she started working as a journalist for the newspaper Dagens Nyheter where she stayed until 1896.

She married the opera singer Johannes Elmblad in 1888. Elmblad then travelled extensively with her husband, living in Berlin, Breslau, Prague and Bayreuth. At the last city, her interest in the music of Richard Wagner flourished, which led to her producing a Swedish translation of Der Ring des Nibelungen (The Ring of the Nibelung) in 1905. She followed this with translations of Parsifal in 1917 and Die Meistersinger von Nürnberg, as well as texts for music by Felix Mendelssohn, Franz Schubert and Robert Schumann. During this time, she also resumed writing children's stories, the first of which she had produced in 1886.

Returning to Sweden, she rejoined Nya Idun, chairing the society between 1918 and 1921. During that time, she also produce biographies, including one of Jenny Lind in 1920. She also produced the first Swedish text for the song of Saint Lucy for Saint Lucy's Day in 1924. Elmblad died in Stockholm on 23 May 1926.

== Writing ==
=== Adult fiction ===
- Mot sin lycka: berättelse [Against his Happiness: A Story]. Iduns romanbibliotek; 15. Stockholm: Idun. 1897.
- Fru grefvinnan: berättelse [The Countess: A Story]. Iduns romanbibliotek; 29. Stockholm: Idun. 1902.

=== Biography ===
- Hans Sachs. Stockholm: Ord och Bild. 1914.
- Emil Sjögren in memoriam. Stockholm: C.A.V. Lundholm. 1918.
- Jenny Lind: en livsstudie [Jenny Lind: A Life]. Svenska kvinnor, 99-1307890-3; 1. Uppsala: Lindblad. 1920.

=== Children's fiction ===
- Ljusa skyar: sagor och berättelser [Bright Clouds: Fairy Tales and Stories]. Stockholm: Sv. Familj-journ. 1886. illustrated by Jenny Nyström.
- Sommarby och vinterskär [Summer Village and Winter Island]. Stockholm: Skoglund. 1907. illustrated by Lotten Rönquist.
- Vi små i en vrå: samlade sagor i urval [From Deep in a Corner: A Selection of Collected Fairy Tales]. Stockholm: Svithiod. 1910.
- Rosengull. 1912 : saga [Rose Gold: A 1912 Saga]. Stockholm: Folkskolans barntidning. 1912. illustrated by Aina Stenberg-Masolle.
- Ormkungen och andra sagor [The Serpent King and Other Fairy Tales]. Barnbiblioteket Saga, 99-0448970-X; 83. Stockholm: Svensk läraretidning. 1921.
- En fågel sjöng: samlade sagor i original och bearbetning [A Bird Sang: A Collection of Original and Adapted Fairy Tales]. Uppsala. 1922.
- Jag-ska-bara-landet [I Just Have the Country]. Göteborg: Melin. 1925. - Illustrated by Saga Walli.

=== Poetry ===
- Vind för våg: dikter och skisser [Wind and Wave: Poems and Sketches]. Stockholm: Svenska familj-journalen. 1885.
- Dröm och längtan: dikter [Dream and Longing: Poems]. Uppsala: Almqvist & Wiksell. 1928.
