= Sabbatsberg Hospital =

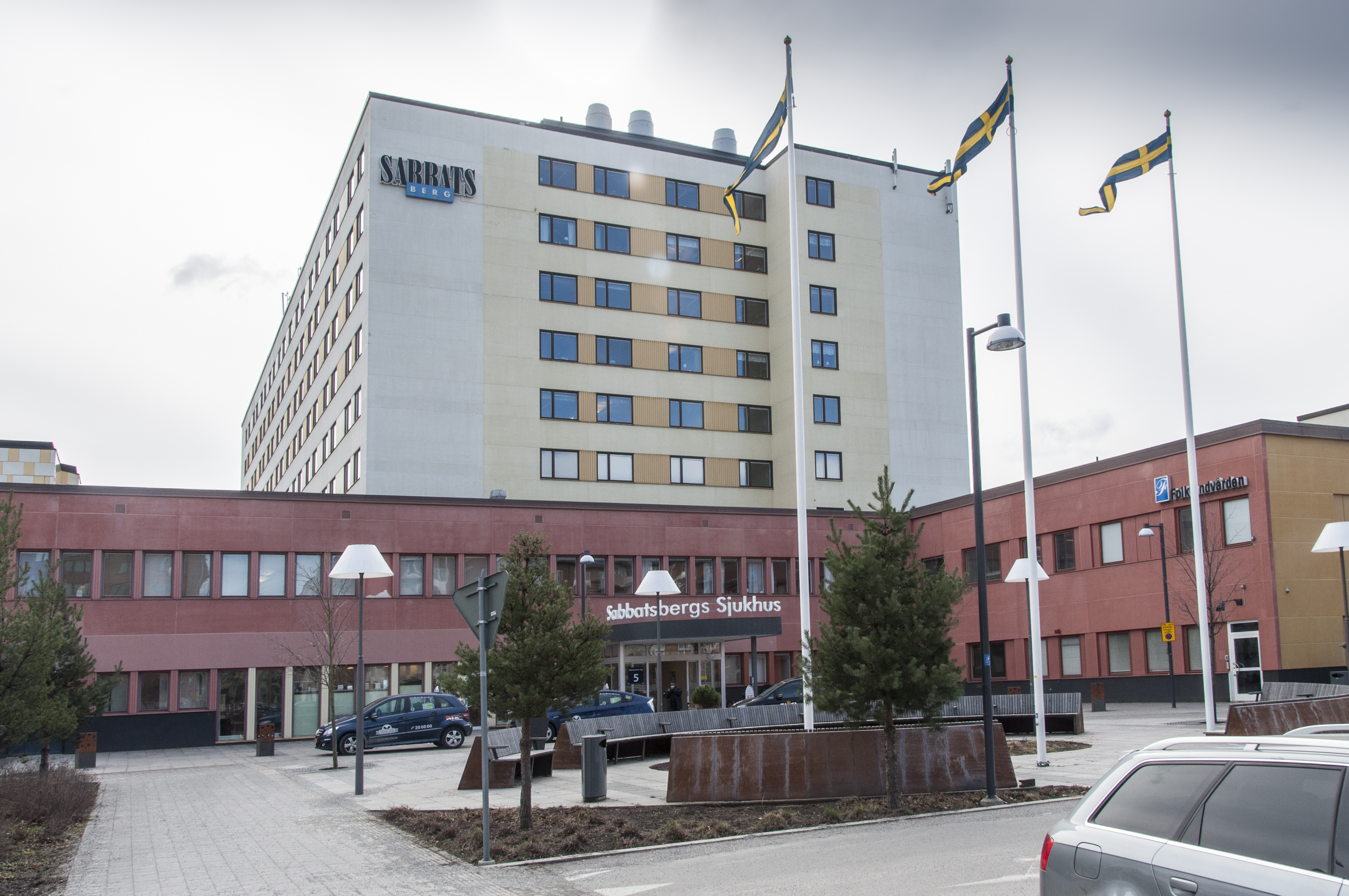
- The former buildings of Sabbatsberg Hospital in 2014

Geography
- Location: Stockholm, Sweden
- Coordinates: 59°20′17″N 18°02′52″E

History
- Opened: 1879
- Closed: 1994

Sabbatsberg Hospital (Swedish: Sabbatsbergs sjukhus) is a former hospital in central Stockholm, Sweden. Its located on Sabbatsberg, situated between Torsgatan, Vasaparken, Tegnérgatan by Barnhusbron, and Dalagatan in Vasastan. It was opened in 1879.

== History ==
Based on the proposal of a committee appointed by the Governor of Stockholm in 1858, it was decided in 1869 to erect a new municipal hospital on the Sabbatsberg site. After the plans were approved by the city council on 2 December 1872, the work began, and in January 1879, the so-called Sabbatsberg Hospital was opened for the admission of patients.

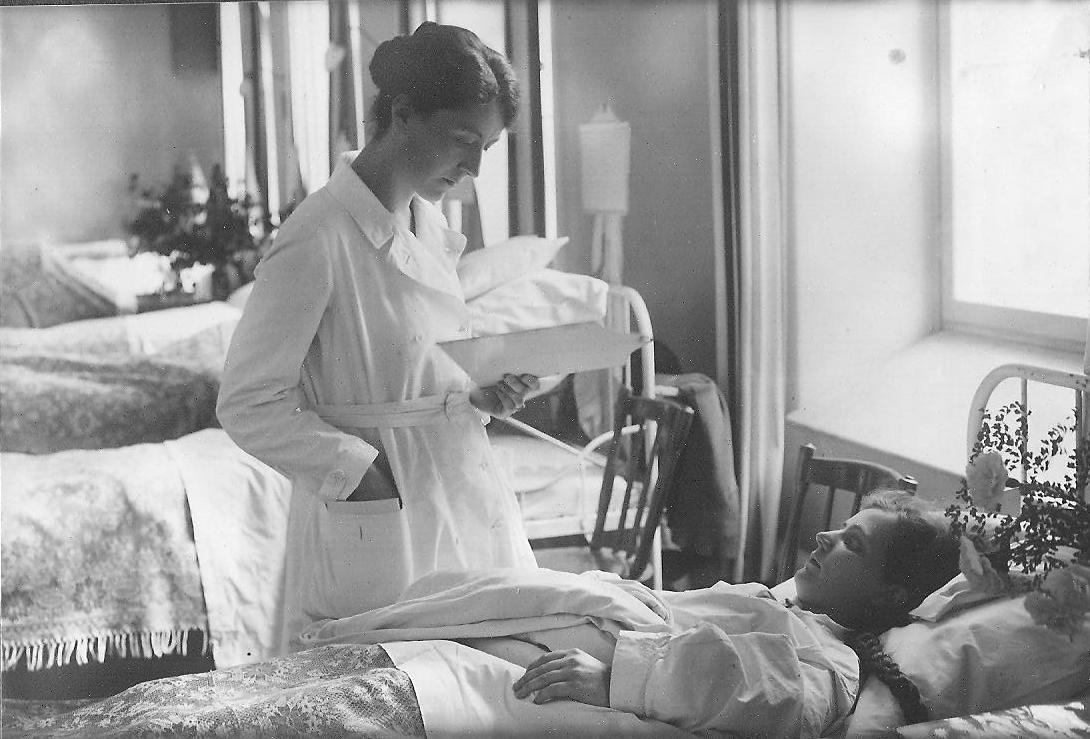
Andrea Andreen (1888–1972), junior doctor at Sabbatsbergs Hospital, circa 1921

The area allocated for the hospital on the eastern part of the Sabbatsberg site amounted to approximately 85,000 square meters. Initially, the hospital consisted of eight interconnected buildings through low, covered walkways, namely six uniform two-story pavilions, an administration building, and an economic building, along with a detached mortuary and necessary outbuildings, ice cellar, and laundry facility. Significant expansions were later undertaken. In 1890, a separate operating building was added with a direct entrance from the northern connecting walkway, entirely detached otherwise; the same year, a new entrance building with a connecting walkway was added, located at the eastern boundary of the site; in 1895, a standalone isolation building with four sickrooms was constructed, intended for patients with contagious diseases such as erysipelas, and for others who were disturbing to other patients due to violent dizziness or otherwise; and in 1899, a tuberculosis pavilion was built, situated in the southernmost part of the hospital's area. A few years later, a convalescent home was erected in the northernmost part of the site, funded with a donation of 140,000 kronor from an estate in Stockholm, along with a "reception facility for rapidly deteriorating patients" (1901). Finally, from 1908 to 1912, a significant expansion of the hospital took place, including both new constructions and extensions or thorough alterations of older premises. The new constructions consisted of four sick pavilions (three for patients in general wards and one for patients in private rooms), a new entrance building, a radiology department, a new surgical department, and a new economic department, all interconnected by a connecting walkway with the older complex. Additionally, a standalone building was constructed with departments for patients suffering from diseases of the eyes, ears, nose, throat, and pharynx, new autopsy facilities with a burial chapel, and ventilation sheds, among others. The old entrance building was merged with the expanded surgical department, the administration building received a new interior, and the old economic building was transformed into a bath department. In the mid-1910s, Sabbatsberg Hospital provided space for 679 patients in the actual medical departments, including 312 in the medical, 259 in the surgical, 60 in the gynecological, and 24 each in the departments for eye patients and ear patients. Additionally, the hospital had 12 places in the isolation department, 2 in two cells, 48 in two so-called summer pavilions, 18 in the "reception facility," and 60 in the convalescent home. In total, there were 819 patient beds available for the hospital's needs. The costs for the original establishment amounted to slightly over 918,000 kronor, including the costs for subsequent alterations and extensions. The final cost for the current healthcare facility was estimated to be around 3.3 million kronor.

In 1913, Sabbatsberg Hospital cared for 7,948 patients. The expenses amounted to approximately 650,000 kronor, or 321.84 kronor per day of care. The average cost per patient per day was 3 kronor. These costs were covered by patient fees totaling around 123,000 kronor, and primarily through allocations from the City of Stockholm, slightly over 500,000 kronor. Patients paid daily rates of 4.50 kronor for private rooms, 3 kronor for semi-private rooms, and 1 kronor for general wards if they were residents of Stockholm Municipality, but 6 kronor, 4.50 kronor, and 2.25 kronor respectively if they were from other municipalities. Additionally, free care and assistance are provided to poor patients at the hospital's outpatient clinic; the surgical outpatient clinic alone was visited by approximately 7,000 individuals. The gynecological department provides training to students of the Karolinska Institute by one of its teachers, in addition to offering general courses for the training of nurses. The medical staff consists of 7 senior physicians, one of whom also serves as director, along with 4 junior physicians and 8 assistants. Furthermore, the hospital employs 1 pathologist and 1 head of the radiology department. The nursing staff comprises 4 operating room nurses, 28 registered nurses, and 33 nurse assistants (nursing students). The administration was overseen by a separate board of 5 members, including the hospital director.

The emergency clinic at Sabbatsberg closed in 1994. It is no longer operated as a hospital, although some healthcare-related activities are still located on the grounds, which partially have been rebuilt as housing.

== Design ==
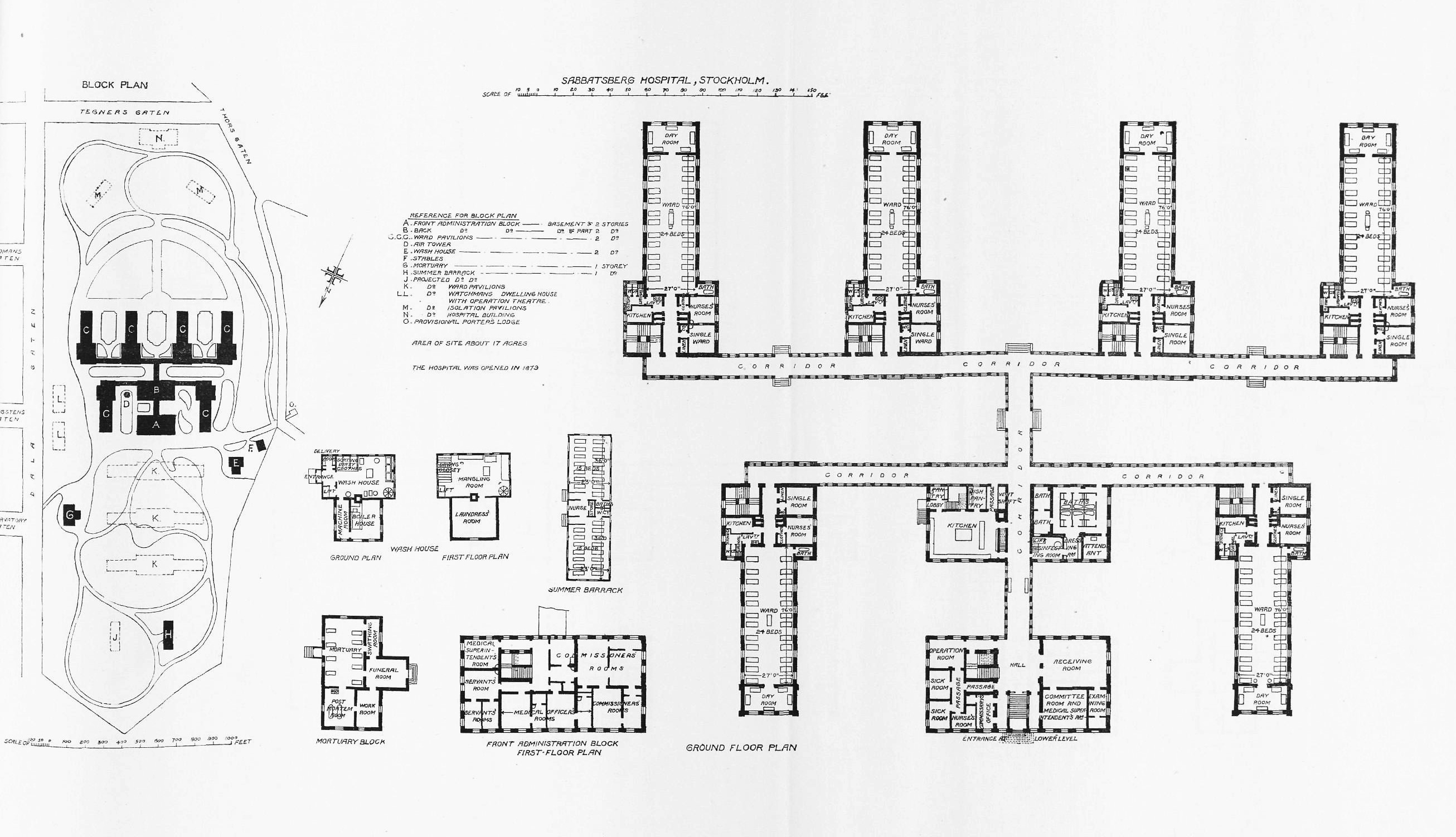
Floor plan in 1893

The buildings intended for general healthcare consisted of 10 pavilions, arranged along two parallel, interconnected walkways. Nine of these medical pavilions had their longitudinal axis almost north and south, so that the long sides faced east and west, allowing for the most uniform sunlight exposure and providing optimal lighting for the large hospital wards. The tenth medical pavilion, containing so-called private rooms, was constructed as an extension of one of the connecting walkways; at the opposite end of the same connecting walkway, the entrance building was situated along Dalagatan. The larger pavilions had either 2 or 3 stories, depending on the terrain, with each floor containing a large ward (for 24 beds) measuring 23 meters in length, 8 meters in width, and 3.85 meters in height, a day room for recovering patients, 1 to 2 isolation rooms, nurses' rooms, a pantry, and a combined bathing and toilet room. The pavilion for individual patients had 3 floors, each containing 6 patient rooms, nurses' rooms, bathing facilities, pantry, toilets, and more. The connecting walkways, running from east to west, were constructed to a height of 1 story, 3–3.7 meters wide.

The entrance building had two main floors, in addition to a basement and an attic with a mansard roof. The ground floor contained a reception hall and waiting room, four examination rooms, a outpatient surgical department, as well as offices for administrative staff, a porter's room, and more. The upper floors were intended for living quarters for administrative staff, nurses, and caretakers. In addition to the outpatient surgical department, there were now two operating rooms, directly connected to the older connecting walkway. Between the old and new pavilions were two buildings (the former administrative and economic buildings), connected on both sides to the walkways of the medical pavilions, containing both an assembly hall and a chapel along with the board's meeting room, rooms for senior physicians, etc., as well as laboratory space, a pharmacy, sewing and mending rooms, as well as residences for assistant physicians, and in a separate building, a very complete bathing department. Adjacent to these buildings was a newly constructed radiology department with an equipment room, darkroom, treatment rooms, etc. Additionally, a separate radium inhalation room was installed in the isolation pavilion. The economic building was located in the westernmost part of the area with a separate driveway from Torsgatan and housed, besides kitchens, laundry facilities, and steam boilers, also dining halls for doctors, nurses, and nurse trainees, assembly rooms for the nurses, as well as residential apartments for the economic staff.

The tuberculosis pavilion, located in the southernmost part of the hospital grounds and constructed over 3 floors, included on the lower level a dining hall (also intended for use as a day room and assembly hall), as well as a pantry, serving room, storage rooms, nurses' rooms, restroom facilities, and more. On each of the upper floors, there were one ward with 6 beds, two rooms each with 3 beds, and two rooms each with 2 beds, totaling 32 beds. The convalescent home was situated north of the medical pavilions and accommodated 60 patients, spread across two floors in addition to a basement and an attic. The pavilion for patients suffering from conditions affecting the eyes, ears, nose, throat, and pharynx was located in the southeastern part of the hospital grounds, consisting of two medical floors and an attic with a mansard roof, each medical floor containing 8 patient rooms of varying sizes, along with operating rooms and other necessary facilities, while the attic housed living quarters for assistant physicians, an operating room nurse, and others.

The heating of the various premises was done partly through warm air and partly with steam. The lighting was electric. For telecommunications, there was a separate switchboard and 82 telephones. Flush toilets were installed in all buildings, and gas was piped into all pantries, sterilization rooms at the surgical departments, all kitchens belonging to residential apartments, the serving room of the nurses' dining hall, the main kitchen, and the ironing room of the laundry facility for heating irons.

== Popular culture ==
Some of the scenes in the film The Girl with the Dragon Tattoo (2011) were shot in the hospital.

== Notable deaths ==
- Olof Palme - (died 28 February 1986). In 1986, Swedish Prime Minister Olof Palme was pronounced dead at 00:06 CET on 1 March at Sabbatsbergs Hospital, after having been shot in the street earlier that night.
