= Observatorielunden =

Hill and park in Stockholm, Sweden

Coordinates: 59°20′30″N 18°03′17″E

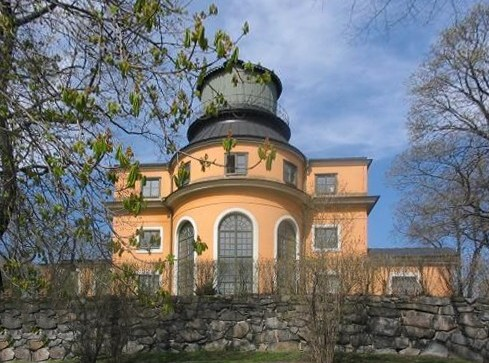
- The 18th century Stockholm Observatory building
- Interactive map of Observatorielunden
- Location: Norrmalm/Vasastan, Stockholm, Sweden
- Status: Open all year

Observatorielunden is a park in the Vasastaden district of Stockholm, Sweden.

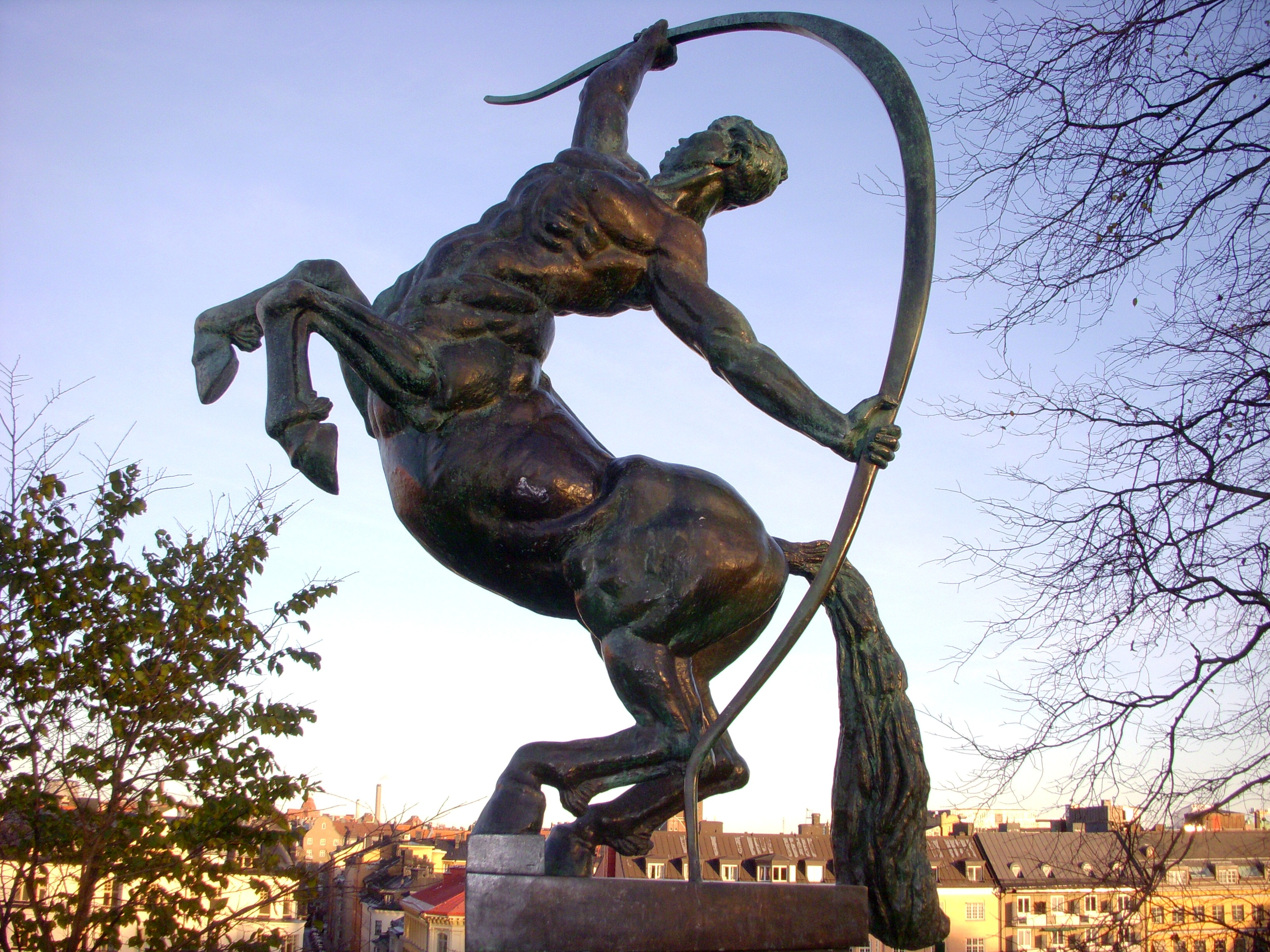
Kentauren at Observatoriekullen

== Location ==
It stretches over the steep hill Observatoriekullen, one of the last remnants of Brunkebergsåsen, the esker that once reached across much of the district of Norrmalm but was mostly levelled during the development of that district. Observatorielunden is bordered by the streets Odengatan to the north, Sveavägen to the east, Kungstensgatan to the south, Drottninggatan to the southwest, and Norrtullsgatan, Sandåsgatan and Gyldéngatan to the west. The Old Stockholm Observatory, which dates from 1753, sits on top of the hill. Stockholm Public Library and the Stockholm School of Economics' main building lie at its edges. On the northeastern corner of the hill stands the bronze sculpture Kentauren from 1936 by Sigrid Fridman (1879-1963).

At the Old Stockholm Observatory there's also a meteorological station which has measured temperature daily since 1756. This is the oldest continuous record of temperature in the world. The temperature is still measured daily there. A newer observatory was built in Saltsjöbaden outside Stockholm and completed in 1931. In 1991 the Observatory Museum was opened to the public.
