= Heike Hanada =

German architect (born 1964)

Heike Hanada (born 1964) is a German architect. Hanada has been working as a free artist and a teacher of architecture since 1999 at Bauhaus University in Weimar, Germany. On 16 November 2007, Hanada's proposal Delphinium won the international architectural competition on the grand expansion of the Stockholm Public Library, one of architect Gunnar Asplund's most important works.

== Stockholm Public Library Extension ==
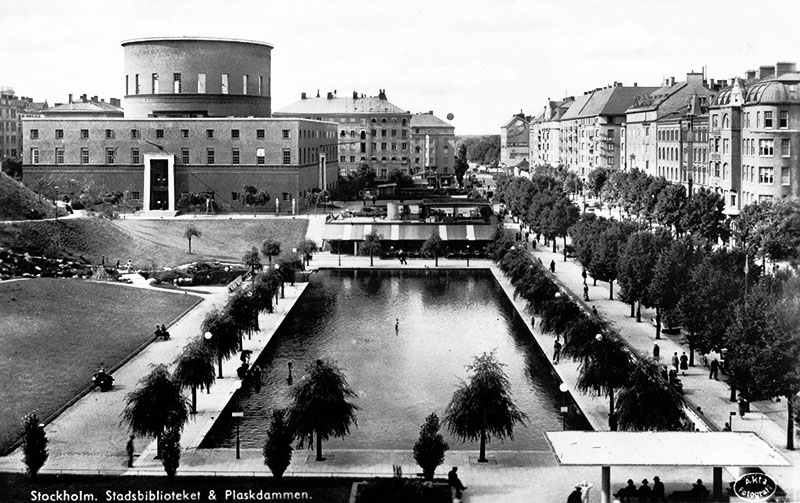
Stockholm Public Library, The Asplund Building, c. 1930

Hanada defeated five other finalists from Denmark, Italy, Finland, Lithuania and the United Kingdom in the competition to expand the famed rotunda library building by Asplund, which opened in 1928. More than 1,000 architects from about 120 countries submitted proposals when the competition was announced in May 2006.

The project named Delphinium includes a glass building, which connects to Asplund's library by a low, podium-like structure enclosing a circular, "secret" garden. The white glass building lights up at night and will "invite to discussion or to just a quiet moment to oneself amongst other people," the jury said.

Heike Hanada first came in contact with the architecture of Asplund in the 1980s. She has designed a building which opens and closes itself. The building has a row of interlinked rooms, both vertically and horizontally. The room sequences, the relation between open and closed, continue far beyond the shell of the building. At the same time Heike Hanada has been intent on keeping everything functionally clear and simple without dead ends and backwaters.

I found it difficult to place a large building right next to Asplund's library. To me the inner courtyard and the low-rise entrance section between the high buildings are a way of marking a distance, creating a rhythm and tranquility in the townscape. [...] The plot is of a kind which will be common in future, with less and less land going spare. A number of decisions will have to be made concerning what is to be demolished and how one can or should adapt oneself when building. It is a tricky balancing act in which conservative conclusions come easily. When a new building stands next to an old one, the difference in periods is made articulate, the new enriches the old and vice versa, resulting in a powerful wholeness.

The extension has officially been put on hold in autumn 2009 after a change in local government and a massive campaign about what critics saw as an unacceptable impact on the original, Asplund approved complex.
