= Gustaf Vasa Church =

- Gustaf Vasa kyrka
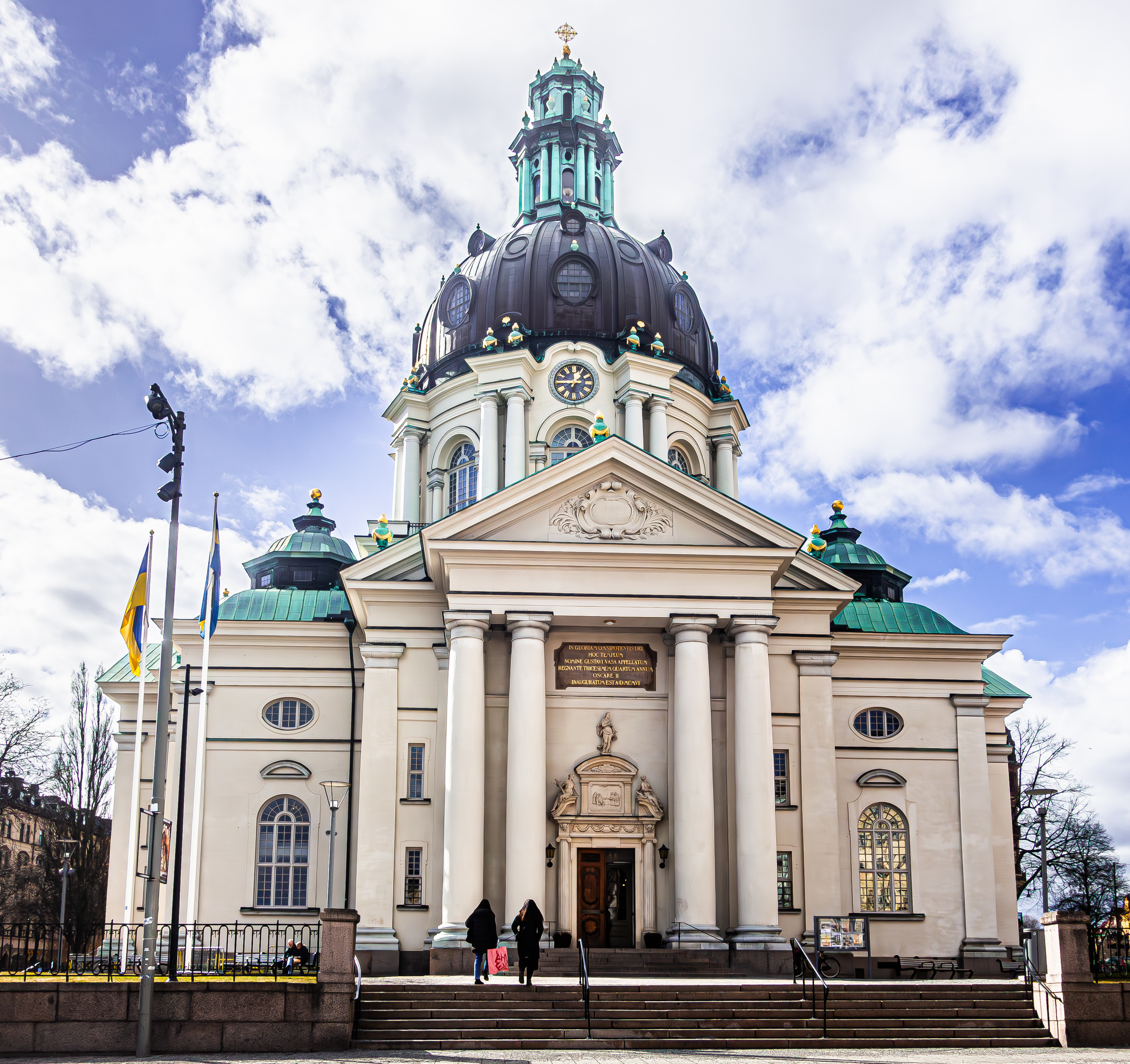
- Gustaf Vasa Church, main entrance facing Odenplan.
- Gustaf Vasa Church
- 59°20′33″N 18°02′51″E
- Location: Vasastaden, Stockholm
- Country: Sweden
- Denomination: Lutheran, Church of Sweden
- Website: gustafvasa.nu

Architecture
- Architect: Agi Lindegren
- Style: Baroque Revival
- Groundbreaking: 1901
- Completed: 10 June 1906

Administration
- Diocese: Diocese of Stockholm
- Parish: Gustaf Vasa Parish

Gustaf Vasa Church (Swedish: Gustaf Vasa kyrka) is a church located in the Vasastaden district of Stockholm, Sweden. Inaugurated in 1906 and named after 16th-century King Gustav Vasa, it was designed by architect Agi Lindegren in the Baroque Revival style. Situated between two busy avenues partially lined with trees, its dome rises 60 metres (200 ft) above the nearby Odenplan plaza. The floor plan is in the shape of a Greek cross and a total of 1100 people are allowed to stay there at one time, making it one of the largest churches in Stockholm.

== Interior ==
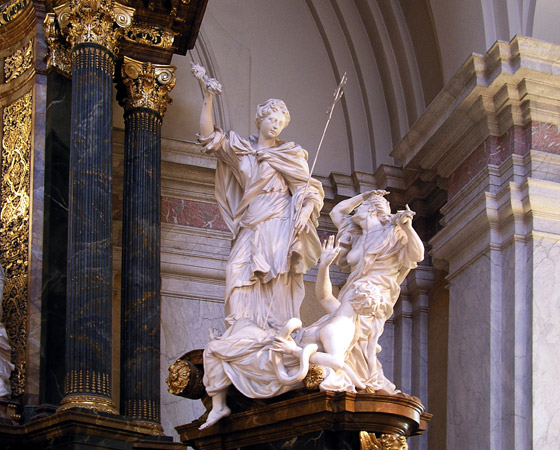
Detail altarpiece

The 15 metres (49 ft) high altarpiece was designed and built by Burchard Precht in his workshop between 1728 and 1731. It is Sweden's largest sculptural work in the Baroque style, originally created for Uppsala Cathedral. Stored away at the Skansen museum for several years, it finally ended up at the Gustaf Vasa Church in 1906.

Viktor Andren painted the interior of the dome and features an interpretation of the Transfiguration of Jesus. The church also has several other frescoes done by the same artist, depicting the Four Evangelists, the Baptism, the Last Supper, the Gospel and the Decalogue.

The church organ was built to the wishes of composer Otto Olsson, who was also the church organist from 1907 to 1956. The organ has 76 voices spread over three manuals and pedals. The crypt beneath the church was originally used as a burial chapel and was expanded in 1924 with what is most likely Sweden's first columbarium.

== See also ==
- List of churches in Stockholm
