= Vasaparken, Stockholm =

City park in Stockholm, Sweden

Coordinates: 59°20′25″N 18°02′36″E

Vasaparken
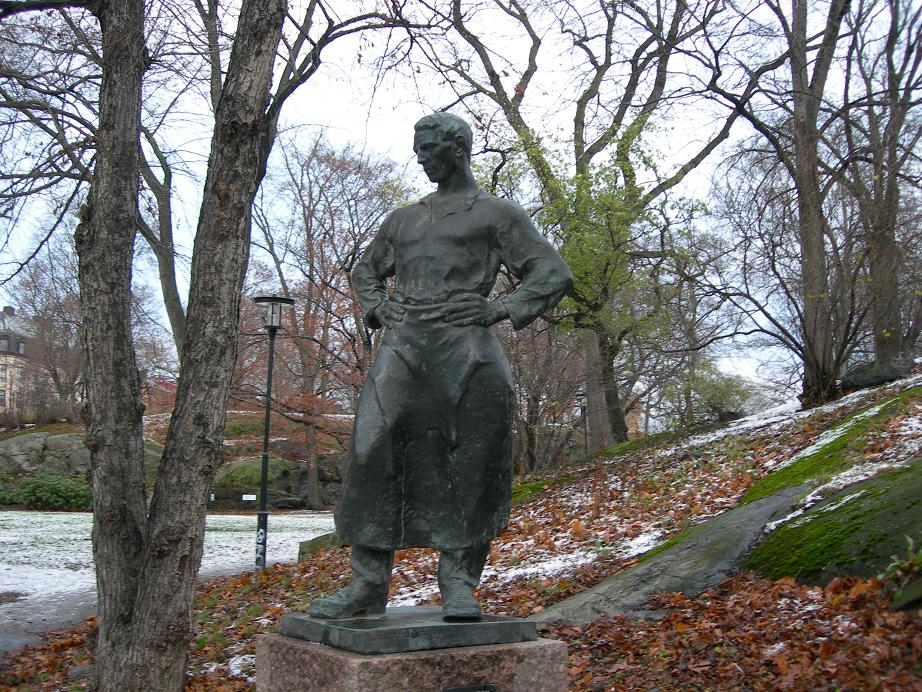
- Statue of The Worker in Vasaparken
- Interactive map of Vasaparken
- Location: Vasastan, Stockholm, Sweden
- Status: Open all year

Vasaparken is a park in the Vasastaden district of Stockholm, Sweden.

== History ==
The park was named after the Royal Vasa Dynasty and lies between the two squares Odenplan and Sankt Eriksplan. South of the park lies the Sabbatsberg hospital.

Vasaparken was established in this area in 19th century. Construction work for the park was started in 1898 and in 1900 the eastern part was almost completed with work continued in the west and southwest until 1908. During World War I, the park was used to grow potatoes for the city.

The world-famous Swedish children's book writer Astrid Lindgren lived in a building by the park, and Vasaparken is mentioned in many of her books. After her death, a corner of the park was renamed in honor of Astrid Lindgren (Astrid Lindgrens terrass).

In 1917, a statue named Arbetaren, by artist Gottfrid Larsson, was erected in the park to honor the Swedish working class. There is also a statue named Romeo and Juliet by artist Olov Thorwald Olsson (1903–1982).
