= Vasastan, Stockholm =

District in central Stockholm, Sweden

Coordinates: 59.350°N 18.033°E

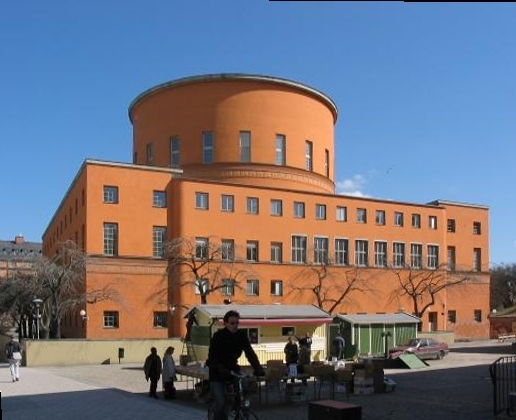
The Stockholm Public Library is one of the most prominent buildings in the district.

Vasastan, or formally Vasastaden, (Swedish for "Vasa town") is a 3.00 km^{2} large city district in central Stockholm, Sweden, being a part of Norrmalm borough.

The major parks in Vasastaden are Vasaparken and Observatorielunden near the centre and Vanadislunden and Bellevueparken in the north.

Vasastaden is considered Sweden’s most expensive district based on average price per square meter, a position the district has held since the 2010s.

== History ==
=== Vasastaden proper ===
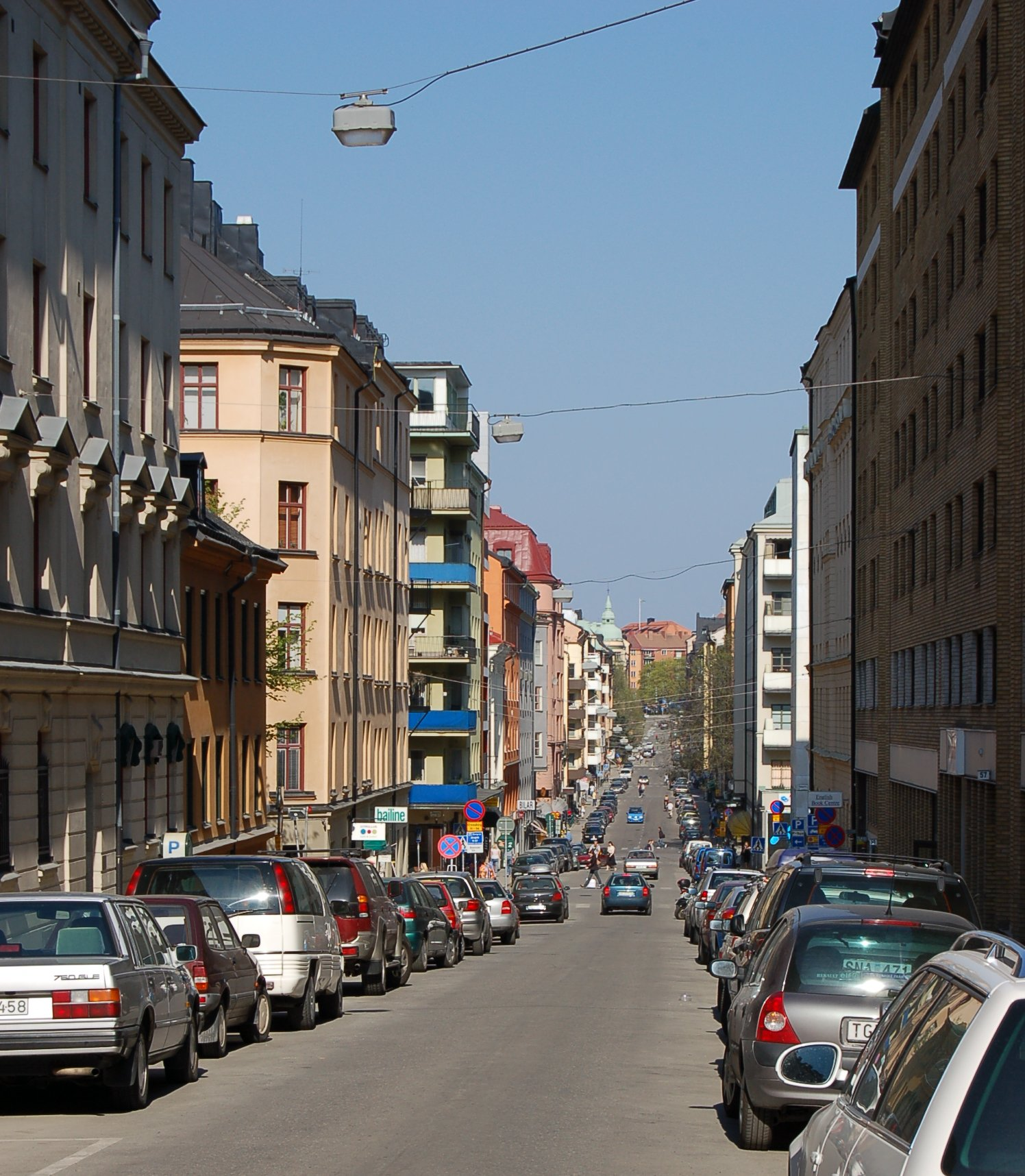
Surbrunnsgatan to the east.

The city district, most likely named after the street Vasagatan, in its turn named after King Gustav Vasa in 1885, was still a peripheral part of the city in the early 1880s. Before the end of that decade, however, some 150 buildings had been built and only the properties along Odengatan remained vacant. The expansion was preceded by a city plan established in 1879, a slightly more modest edition of the 1866 intentions of city planner Albert Lindhagen, in its turn largely a continuation north of an original 17th-century plan. Like the Baroque plan, the new plan took little or no account of local topographic variations, and where the two failed to reconcile, sites were simply set aside as parks or for major structures such as the Sabbatsberg Hospital.

Compared to central Stockholm, streets were widened to 18 metres, except for the main east-west-bound street Odengatan which was made 30 metres wide and adorned with plantings after continental prototypes. In accordance with construction charters from the 1870s, building corners where filleted and building heights adopted to street width and limited to five floors — embellishing proportions intended to bring light and air into the urban space. The Neo-Renaissance plaster architecture of the middle class residential buildings in southern Vasastaden is highly reminiscent of the Ringstraße in Vienna; the ground floors are dominated by horizontal elements with columns and pilasters above, while accentuated cornices closes the vertical compositions. Later architects failed to appreciate these Neo-Renaissance buildings and freed many of them of most of their decorations.

=== Sibirien ===
The north-eastern part of the district is called Sibirien (Siberia in English). The area borders Östermalm but has historically been a stronghold for the working class.

The origin of the name Sibirien (Eng. Siberia) originates from a time when the area was inhabited by the poor, who could not afford heating. People started to say that the area was "as cold and as far away as Siberia", hence the nickname.

=== Birkastaden ===
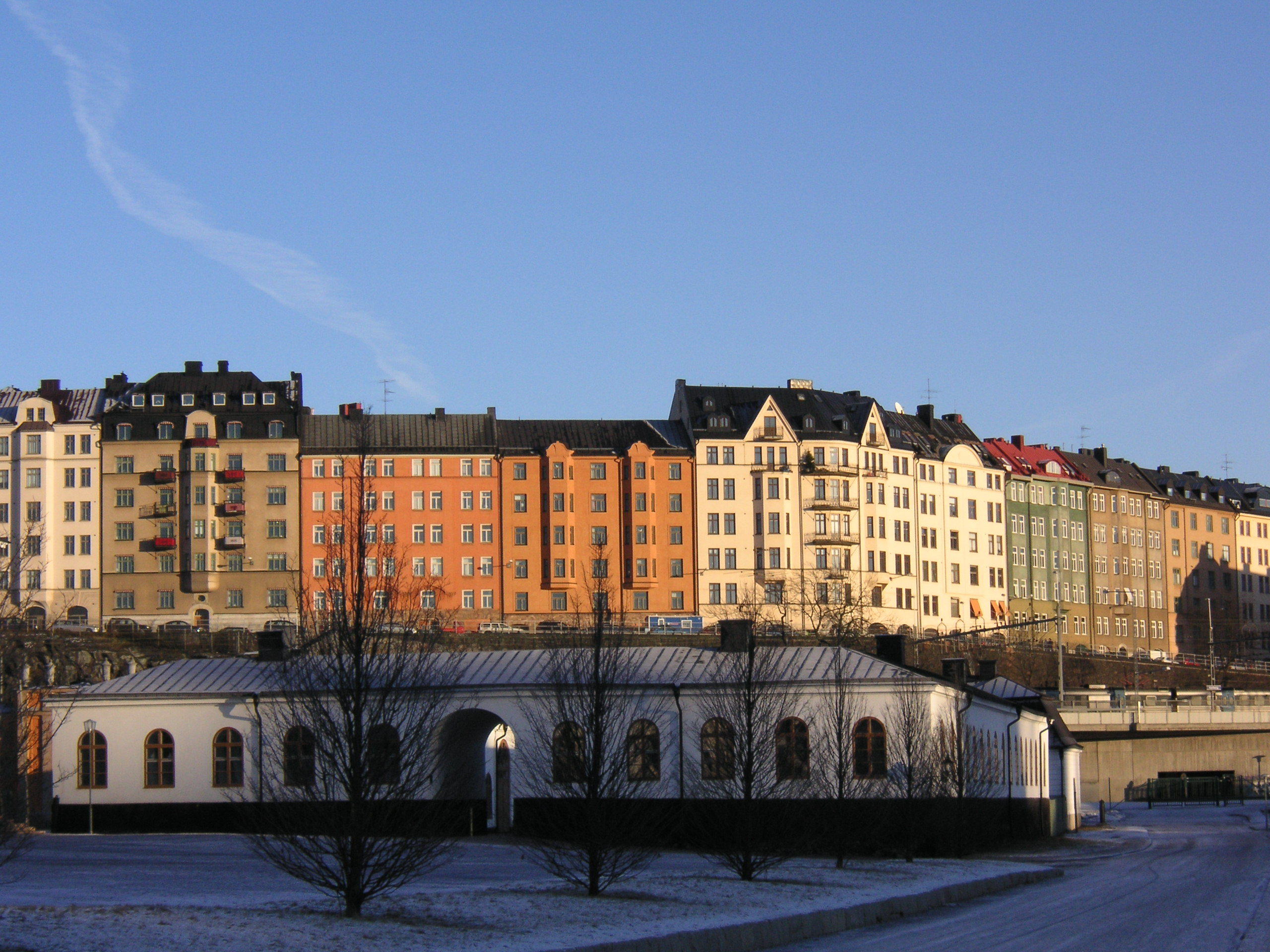
Birkastaden rising tall above Karlberg Palace.

In the north-western corner of the district are eight blocks forming Birkastaden, named after the 9th century settlement Birka, sometimes called Rörstrandsområdet (the "Rörstrand Area") which forms the compact northern frontier of Stockholm's historical city centre. As described above, Lindhagen's original intentions for the elevated area was to keep it as a park featuring the 17th century avenue of Karlberg Palace. In the city plan of 1879, however, the area was divided into two large blocks, which were split up into smaller properties in 1886, on a request from the local landowner, porcelain factory Rörstrand. This resulted in a new city plan which was adopted to local topographic variations and therefore features non-perpendicular street crossings.

Few buildings were constructed before the start of the 20th century, but construction work soon boomed to culminate in 1905–06, speculation causing many buildings to change owners several times before their completion. Virtually all the buildings in Birkastaden are Art Nouveau, a result of both the brief construction period and the fact that some 50 buildings were designed by architects Dorph & Höög, at the time the largest architectural practice in Northern Europe. The buildings of Birkastan feature oriel windows, towers on the corners, rounded pediments and bright and plain plaster façades with thrifty decorations. As a result of speculation, the backyards are narrow, and many flats shadowy. From the start, however, Birkastan was a mixed area shared by both low and high income earners.

=== Röda bergen ===
Falugatan street in Röda Bergen.

A doorway in Röda Bergen.

Röda bergen ("Red Mountains"), the hilly area just north of Birkastan, was unsuitable for the regular and perpendicular street pattern envisaged for Vasastaden, but proved excellent for the new city planning ideals where the terrain was allowed to govern city plans. The plan for Röda Bergen was designed by P O Hallman, who during the 1910s also produced similar plans for Lärkstaden inspired by the ideas of Austrian architect Camillo Sitte. His plan for Röda Bergen was adopted in 1909, but because of World War I most of these plans remained unrealised until the 1920s. In 1923 the plan, slightly modified by Sigurd Lewerentz, was finally established.

The buildings facing the surrounding blocks are traditional 5–6 floors residential buildings forming a wall around Röda Bergen. From the monumental eastern entrance, an avenue (Rödabergsgatan) leads west to a round elevated space where a church was originally planned. Perpendicular to this avenue, the heavily trafficked Torsgatan cuts through the area. The blocks within Röda Bergen are limited to 2–3 floors and most of the backyards are open in one end, which allows for plenty of sun light and series of spaces appealing to the eye. Hallman's design was a sharp break with the contemporary narrow, dark, and often filthy backyards. In contrast to them, the involved architects — including Björn Hedwall, Paul Hedqvist, and Sven Wallander — carefully detailed the façades and gables facing the interior with simple classical ornaments and warm red and yellow colours. Of the 2.500 flats in the area, many included novelties such as warm and cold water, WC, and even bath tubes, but most of them were small — half of them was a single room with a kitchen or even less.

=== Atlas ===
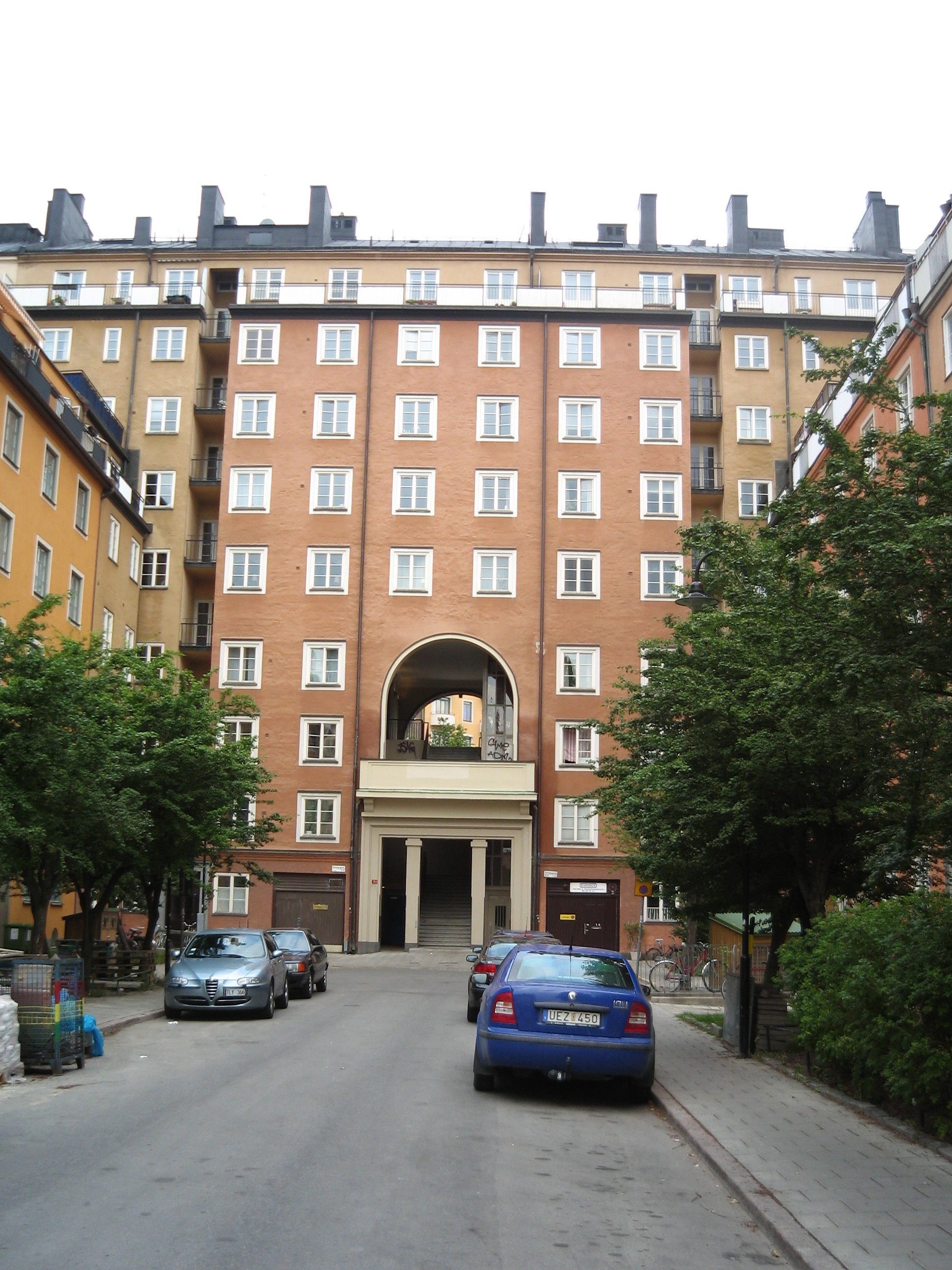
One of the monumental stairways leading down to the Atlas Area.

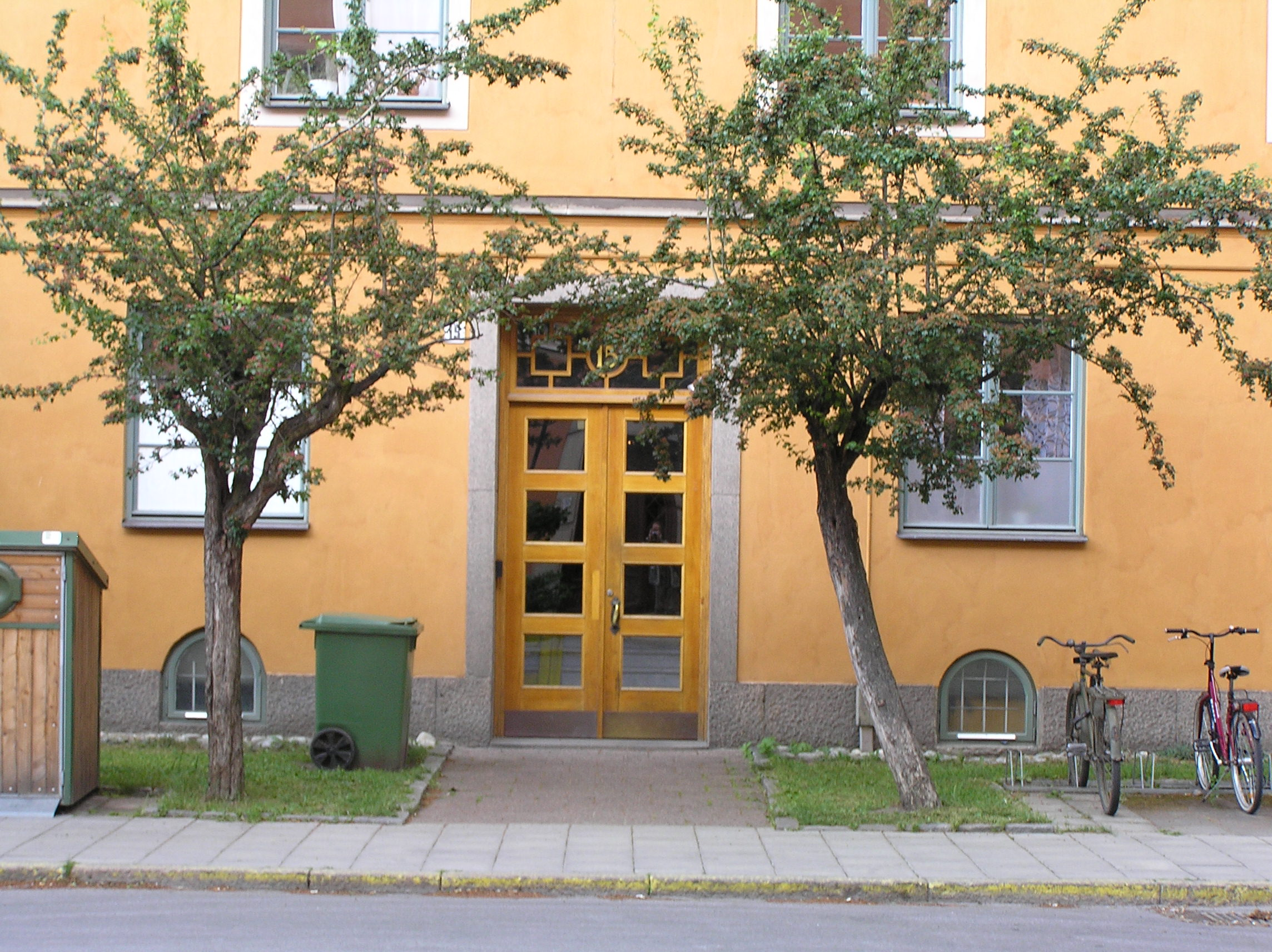
A door in Atlas.

The area next to the Sankt Eriksbron bridge was until the turn of century 1900 a heavily industrial district. The Atlas Area, east of the bridge and named after industrial company Atlas AB whose workshops used to occupy the area, presents features unique to Stockholm. The plan for the area was passed in 1926 and construction works immediately followed. In contrast to the newly built Röda Bergen, much of which was built by HSB, the builders at Atlas were private entrepreneurs. While this resulted in a much criticized high exploitation, the city building committee in 1926 concluded the area could boast an intelligible order and a regularity the neighbouring Rörstrand Area still couldn't present notwithstanding recent redesign attempts.

The most striking feature of Atlas is the level difference between the surrounding streets and the area itself. Like at Röda Bergen, the buildings delimiting Atlas form a coherent wall where the exterior façades are six floors tall while the interior façades are nine floors tall. The buildings inside the area are 5–6 floors, concealing the dark narrow backyards while separated by widened streets with plantations. The difference in level was solved by mean of monumental flights of stairs resulting in the tall porticoes leading into the area.

The flats in Atlas were small — 1–2 rooms and a kitchen — and dark — a result of exploitation and the wide building volumes — but featured modernities such as central heating and bathrooms. The reduced classical ornamentation and the perpendicular plan has, however, given the area a monumentality which is characteristic for the National Romantic Swedish architecture of the 1920s. The contrast between the heavily trafficked surroundings streets and the calm interior of Atlas, brilliantly exposed through the large porticoes, still makes Atlas a popular area.
