= Vanadislunden =

Park in Stockholm, Sweden

Coordinates: 59°20′55″N 18°03′12″E

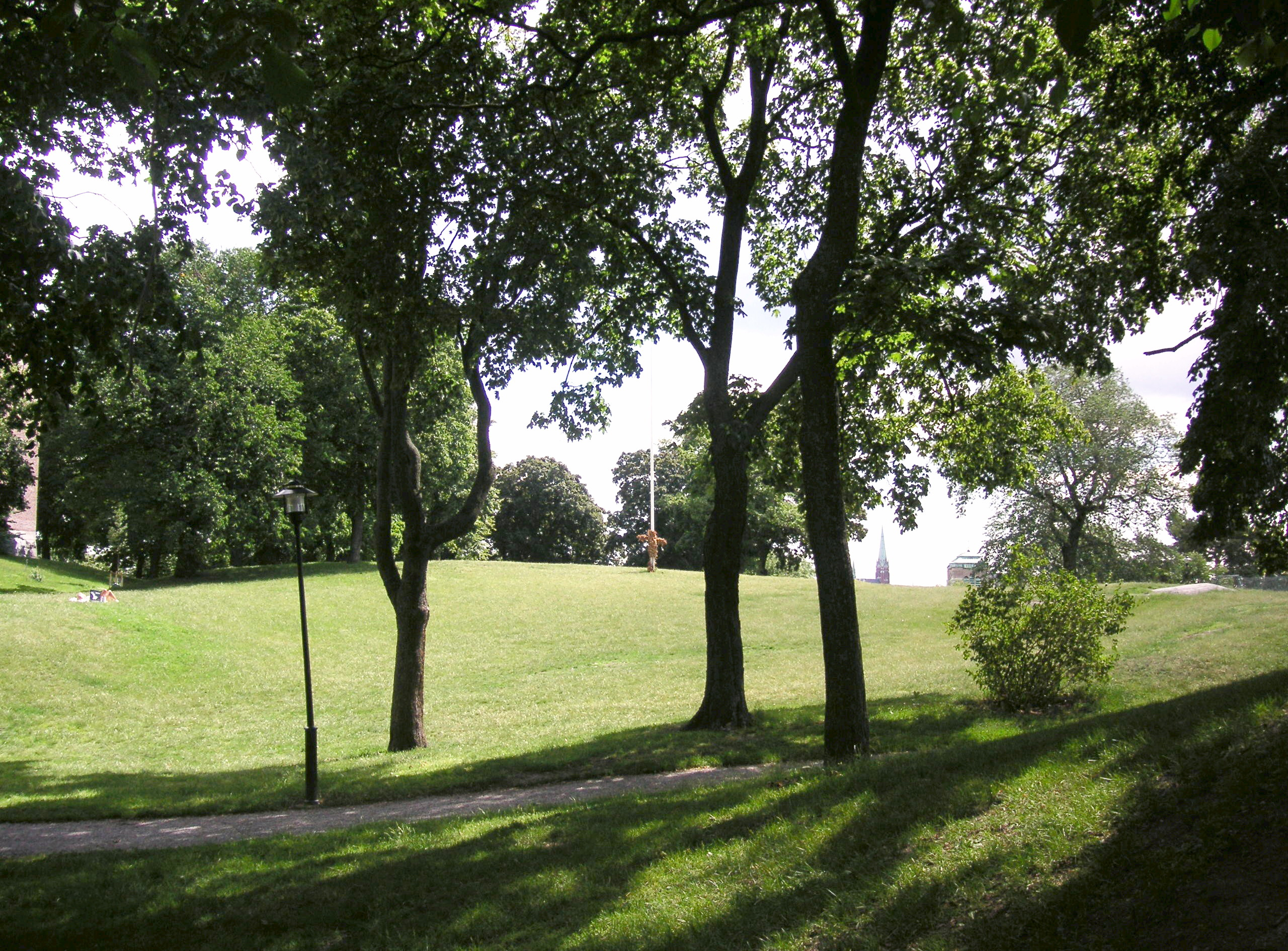
- Interactive map of Vanadislunden
- Location: Vasastan, Stockholm, Sweden

Vanadislunden is a park located in the district of Vasastaden in central Stockholm, Sweden.

== History ==
One of Stockholm's largest parks, the area covers about 9 hectares and measures approximately 430 × 270 meters. Development first started in 1885. In 1893 about 2,000 trees and shrubs were planted. The park was largely completed in 1903. The area is named after Vanadis, which is another name for the Norse Goddess Freyja.

== Reservoir ==
Vanadislunden is the site of Vanadislundens water reservoir, (Vanadislundens vattenreservoar). A significant water reservoir, with a volume of 8,100 m³, it was erected during the years 1913–1918. It has a castle-like design and was designed by architect Gustaf Améen (1864-1949).

== Artwork ==
On a hill in the northwestern part of the park is the sculpture "Flicka i aftonsol". The statue was carved in 1955 by Swedish sculptor Anders Jönsson (1883-1965).

There are also notable artworks by Carl Eldh and Einar Forseth at St Stephen's Church (see below).

== St Stephen's Church ==
St. Stephen's Church (Sankt Stefans Kyrka or Stefanskyrkan) is situated in the southern part of the park. The original church was built of wood in 1899, but architect Carl Möller began in 1901 to draw up designs for a more substantial building. The present church was completed and consecrated in 1904. (The original wooden church was relocated to the Aspudden area of the city, and rededicated to Saint Sigfrid of Sweden.) The church is built on a steep slope, with a significant difference of ground level on its two sides, but the building rests solidly on a large granite foundation. There is a notable carved crucifix by Carl Eldh on the southern gable end of the building. Inside, the sanctuary of the church is dominated by a large and striking triptych by artist Einar Forseth, painted for the church in the 1920s.

== Gallery ==
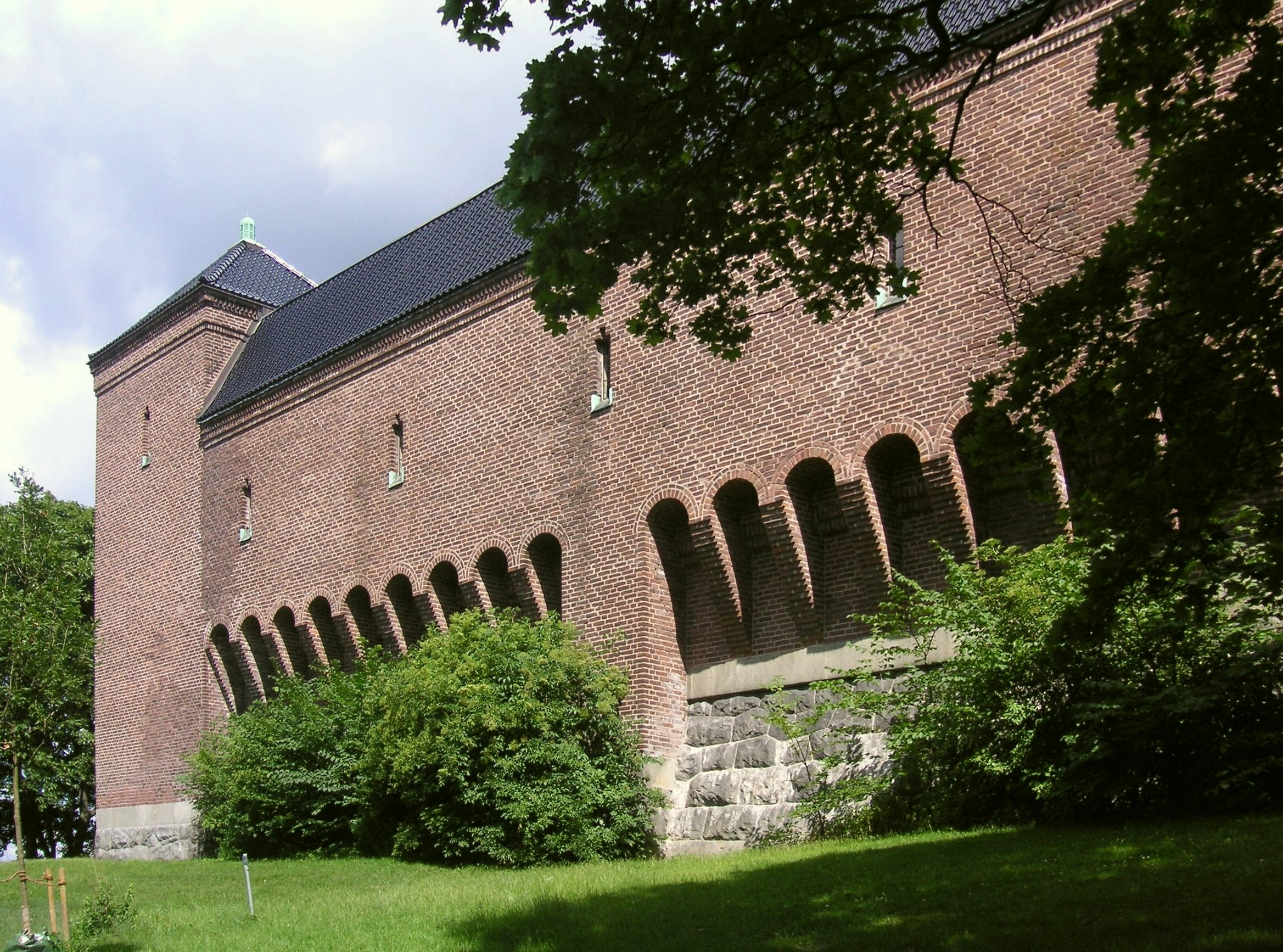
Vanadislundens water reservoir (Vanadislundens vattenreservoar)

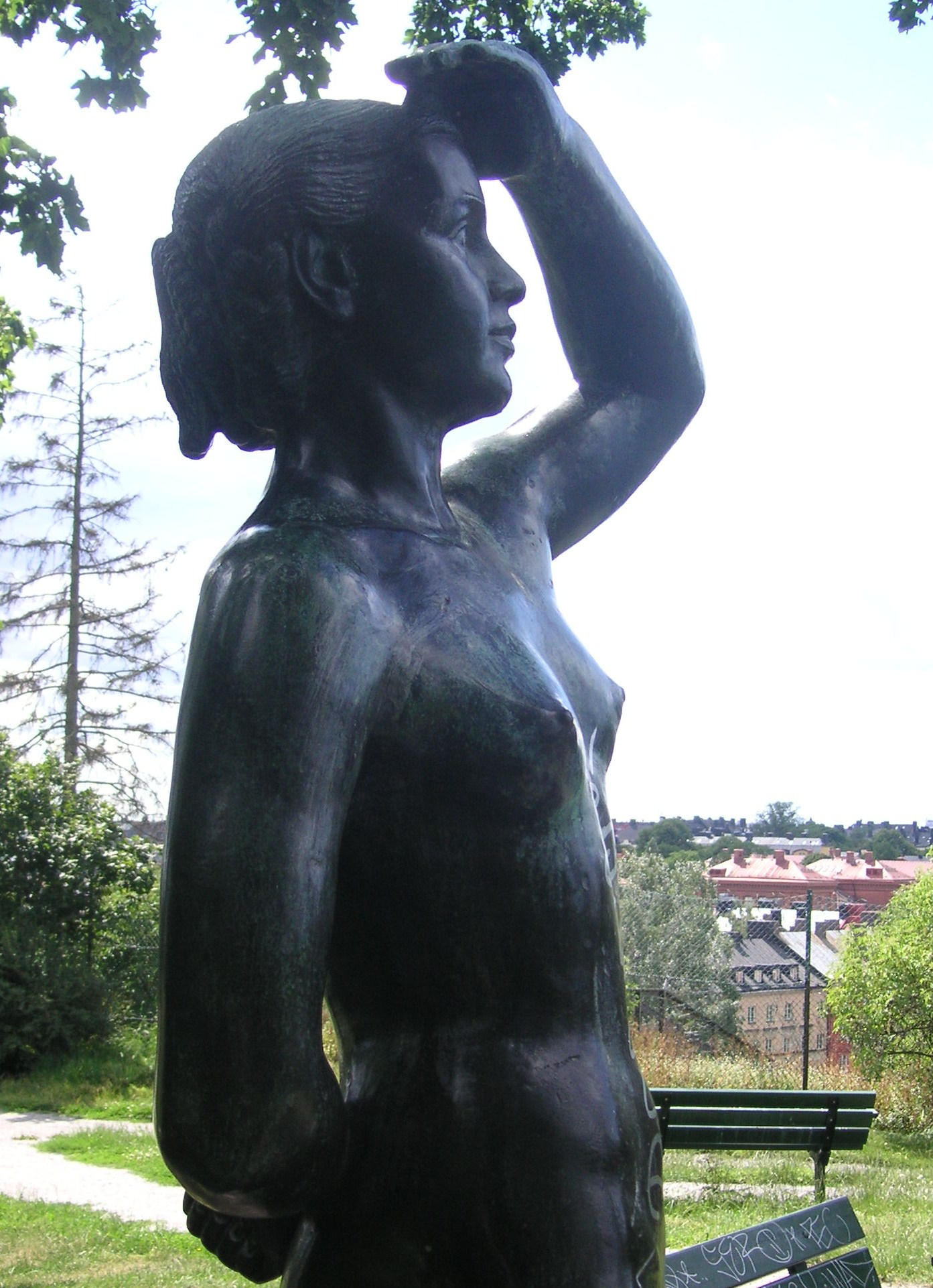
Flicka i aftonsol by Anders Jönsson

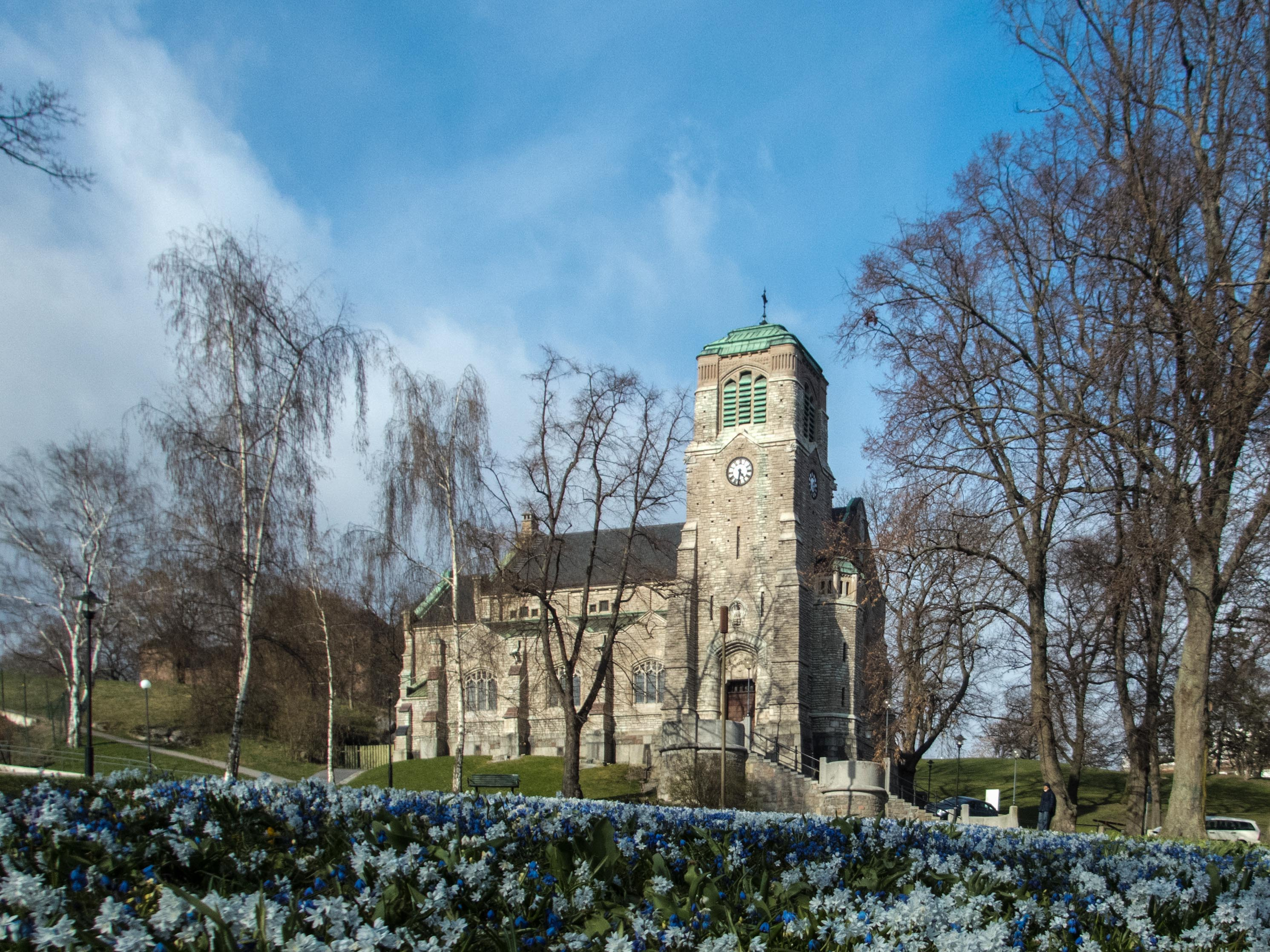
St. Stephen's Church (Stefanskyrkan)
