= Stockholm Public Library =

Library in Stockholm, Sweden

Coordinates: 59.34338°N 18.0543°E

Stockholms stadsbibliotek
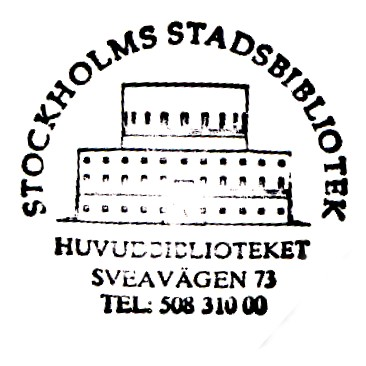

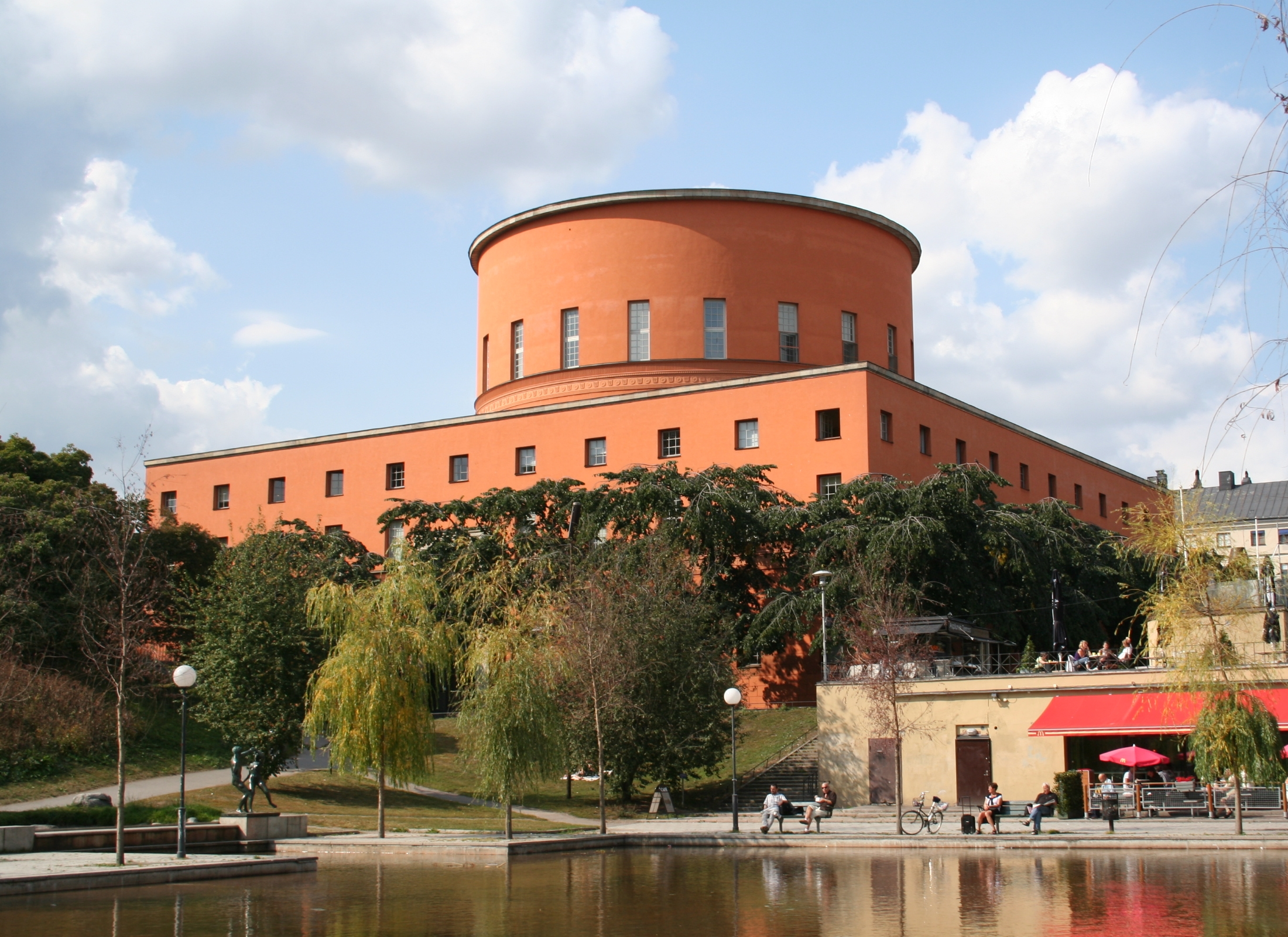
- Exterior of main building from the west
- Location: Stockholm, Sweden
- Type: Public library
- Established: 1928
- Architect: Gunnar Asplund
- Branches: 40

Collection
- Items collected: 2,000,000 (4,400,000 items)

Other information
- Budget: 110,000,000 SEK ($13,470,000)
- Employees: 200
- Website: http://biblioteket.stockholm.se/

Stockholm Public Library (Swedish: Stockholms stadsbibliotek or Stadsbiblioteket) is a library building in Stockholm, Sweden, designed by Swedish architect Gunnar Asplund, and one of the city's most notable structures. The name is today used for both the main library itself, located close to Odenplan, as well as the municipal library system of Stockholm.

Since 2024 the building has been closed for renovation. It is planned to open again in 2028.

== Architecture ==
Discussed by a committee of which Asplund himself was a member from 1918, a design scheme was proposed in 1922, and construction began in 1924. Partly inspired by the Barrière Saint-Martin (Rotonde de la Villette) by Claude Nicolas Ledoux, Asplund abandoned earlier ideas for a dome in favour of a rotunda whose tall cylinder gives the exterior some monumentality. In the course of its planning, he reduced elements of the classical order to their most abstract geometrical forms, for the most part eliminating architectural decor. Stockholm Public Library was Sweden's first public library to apply the principle of open shelves where visitors could access books without the need to ask library staff for assistance, a concept Asplund studied in the United States during the construction of the library. All the furnishings in all the rooms were designed for their specific positions and purposes.

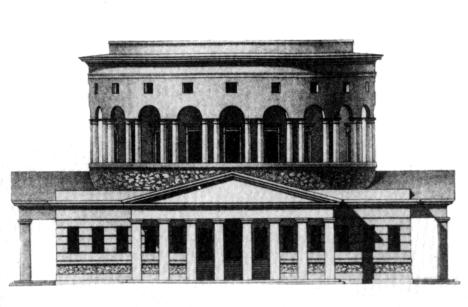
Ledoux: Rotonde de la Villette, Paris

Officially opened on 31 March 1928 in the presence of Prince Eugen, due to financial constraints the library was still missing its west wing which was only added in 1932 to complete the approximately square base around the rotunda of the main reading room. Stockholm Public Library is one of Asplund's most important works and illustrates his gradual shift from classicism to functionalism.

Also designed by Asplund and completed in 1931 is the parkland to the south with its large pond and the shops along Sveavägen. The three simple annex buildings to the west, too, formed part of Asplund's original concept but were designed by other architects, i.e. Erik Lallerstedt (two blocks furthest west, 1929–30 and 1932) and Paul Hedqvist (1952–53).

Charles Holden's design of Arnos Grove tube station in North London is said to be based on the Stockholm Public Library.

== Holdings ==
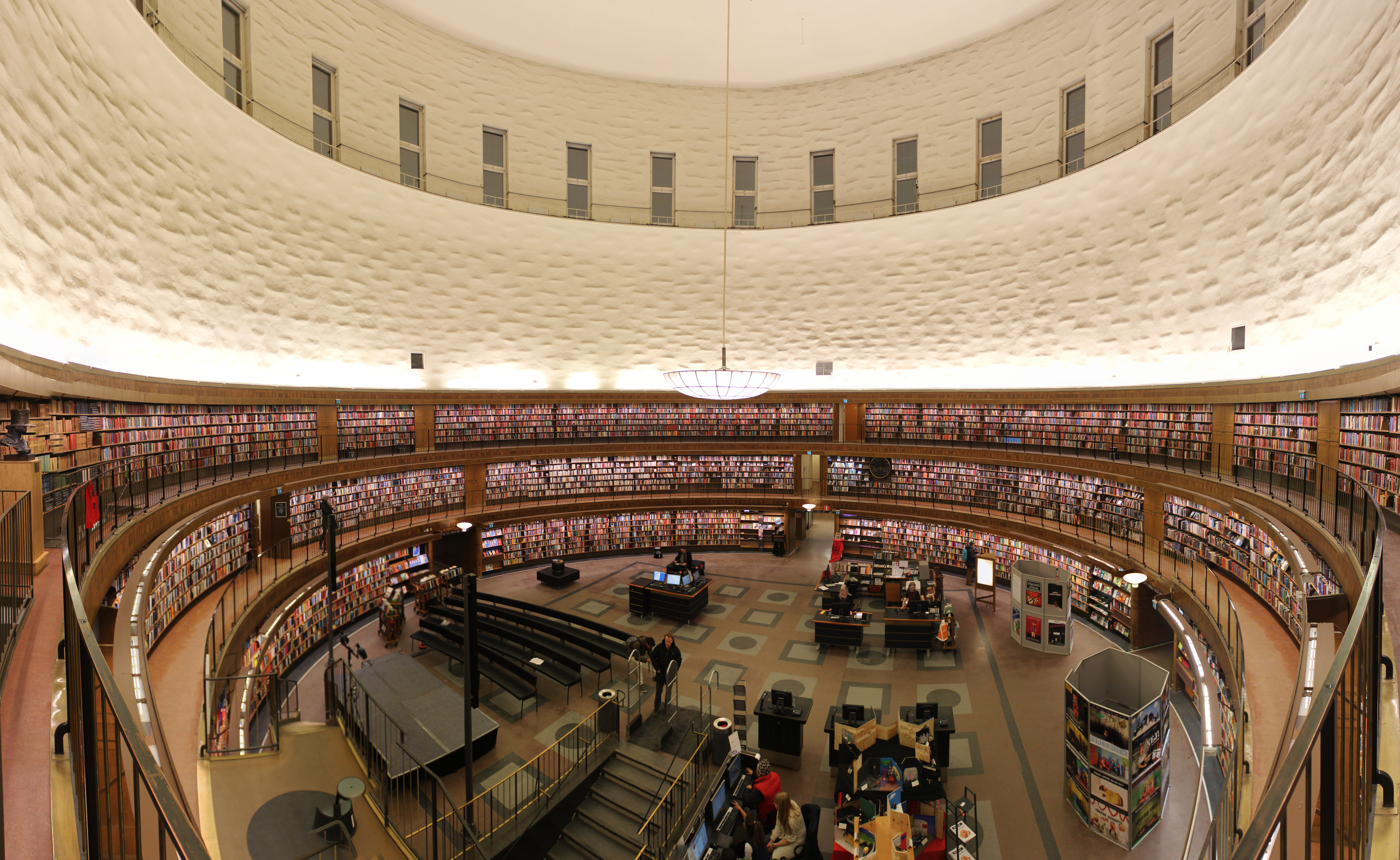
The inside of the rotunda

Stockholm Public Library includes more than 1.5 million books.

The "international library" was the section for foreign languages, housed in two floors of an annex behind the main building. It closed in 2019, and the foreign language section is since 2020 mostly located in the Kungsholmen library.

=== Proposed future expansion ===
In 2006, the announcement of an international architectural competition for a library extension attracted 1,170 entries, though few leading international architects participated. The new structure was to be built next to Asplund's main building, using the site occupied by the three annex buildings, whose fate (i.e. demolition or integration) was deliberately left open in the brief.

On 16 November 2007, little-known German architect Heike Hanada was declared the winner with her proposal Delphinium. Her project includes a high-rise glass building, spatially removed from Asplund's main library but connected to it by a low, podium-like structure with a semi-circular courtyard into which the slope of the Observatorielunden seems to flow.

Although Hanada was instructed to produce preliminary plans for the project's realisation, the extension was put on hold in late 2009. This was due to a change in city government with different priorities as well as a local campaign turned international about what critics saw as an unacceptable impact on the original, Asplund approved complex.

== See also ==
- Architecture of Stockholm
- List of libraries in Sweden
