= Jonassen =

Jonassen is a surname. Notable people with the surname include:

- Emil Jonassen (born 1993), Norwegian football player
- Fartein Døvle Jonassen (born 1971), Norwegian novelist and translator
- Hagbard Jonassen (1903–1977), Danish botanist, quaternary geologist, war resister and nuclear disarmament proponent
- Jess Jonassen (born 1992), Australian cricketer
- Kenneth Jonassen (born 1974), male badminton player from Denmark
- Vitus Jonassen Bering or Vitus Bering (1681–1741), Danish-born Russian navigator in the service of the Russian Navy

== See also ==
- Jonassen Island, one of several Antarctic islands around the peninsula known as Graham Land
- Jonassen Rocks, small group of rocks lying off the south coast of South Georgia
- Joensen
- Johannessen
- Johnsen
- Jonasson
- Jonsson
