= Ulla-Mari Brantenberg =

Norwegian artist (born 1947)

Ulla-Mari Brantenberg (born 1947) is a Norwegian glass artist.

She was born in Porsgrunn and attended vocational school, graduating in 1965. Bratenberg initially studied ceramics at the Royal Copenhagen factory in Copenhagen and the Norwegian National Academy of Craft and Art Industry in Oslo before developing an interest in glass. In 1971, she returned to Copenhagen to study at the School of Applied Art, now part of the Danmarks Designskole, which opened a glass workshop in 1974. She continued her studies at the National School of Glass in Orrefors, Sweden, from 1975-76.

Brantenberg's professional career as a glass artist began in 1976, when she started working as a glassblower and designer at the Randsfjord Glassworks. However, she struggled working in the traditional male-dominated glass industry, and left to establish Norway's first studio glass workshop with Danish artist Karen Klim at the Frysja Art Centre in 1978-79.

Since the 1980s, the artist has exhibited in a number of solo and group shows in galleries, museums, and art fairs, including the Steninge World Exhibition of Art Glass, the Collect Art Fair, the Southern Norway Art Museum, and the National Museum of Modern Art, Tokyo. Her work is included in museum collections in Norway and abroad, including the Norwegian Nasjonalmuseet, Swedish Nationalmuseum, the Glasmuseet Ebeltoft, and the Victoria and Albert Museum. She resides in Brandbu.

In 2008, she was proclaimed Commander of the Royal Norwegian Order of St. Olav.
