= Jonasson =

Jonasson is a patronymic surname of Swedish origin literally meaning "son of Jonas". Notable people with the surname include:

- Einar Jonasson (1887–1935), Canadian politician from Manitoba; provincial legislator
- Frank Jonasson (1878–1942), American film actor of the silent-film era
- Jonas Jonasson (b. 1961) Swedish writer
- Mats Jonasson (b. 1945), Swedish glass designer
- Niclas Jonasson (b. 1976), Swedish orienteering champion
- Sigtryggur Jonasson (1852–1942), Canadian politician from Manitoba; provincial legislator; leader of the Canadian-Icelandic community
- Sven Jonasson (1909–1984), Swedish professional football player
- Thomas H. Jonasson (b. 1988), Swedish motorcycle racer

== See also ==
- Jonassen
