= Orrefors railway station =

Railway station in Orrefors, Sweden

Coordinates: 56.83548622236472°N 15.742777449142638°E

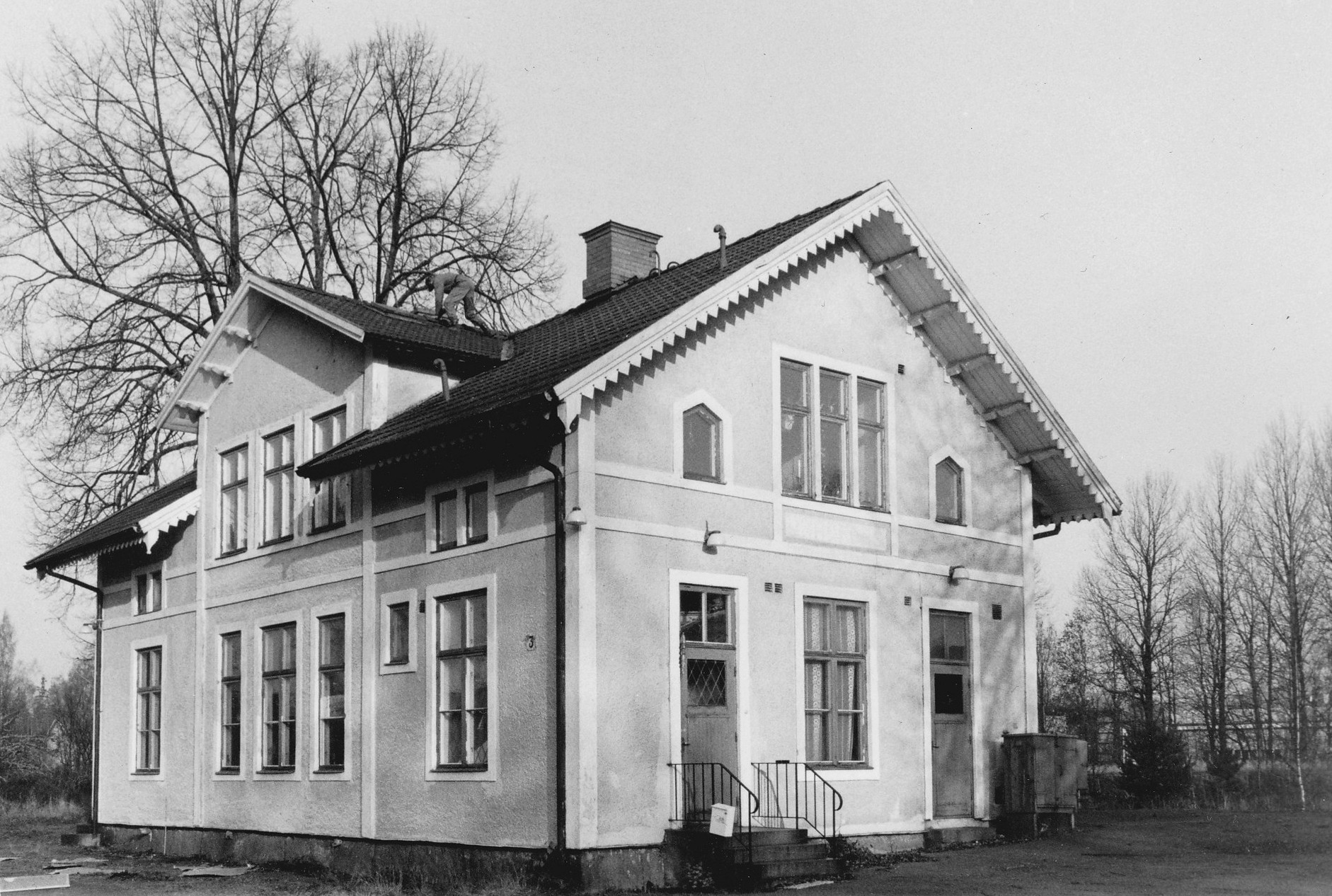

The Orrefors Railway Station, located in Orrefors, Nybro Municipality, Sweden and built in 1875, is protected under Swedish law as valuable national heritage. It lay on the defunct "Nybro-Sävsjöström" railway line. The building has become globally well known through the Swedish film My Life as a Dog which was in part filmed at this site. Ownership of this monument over a railway epoch laid in its grave, was passed from the Swedish State on to artist Eva Fidjeland in 1990.
