= National School of Glass =

Glassmaking school in Sweden

Coordinates: 56.84203°N 15.74594°E

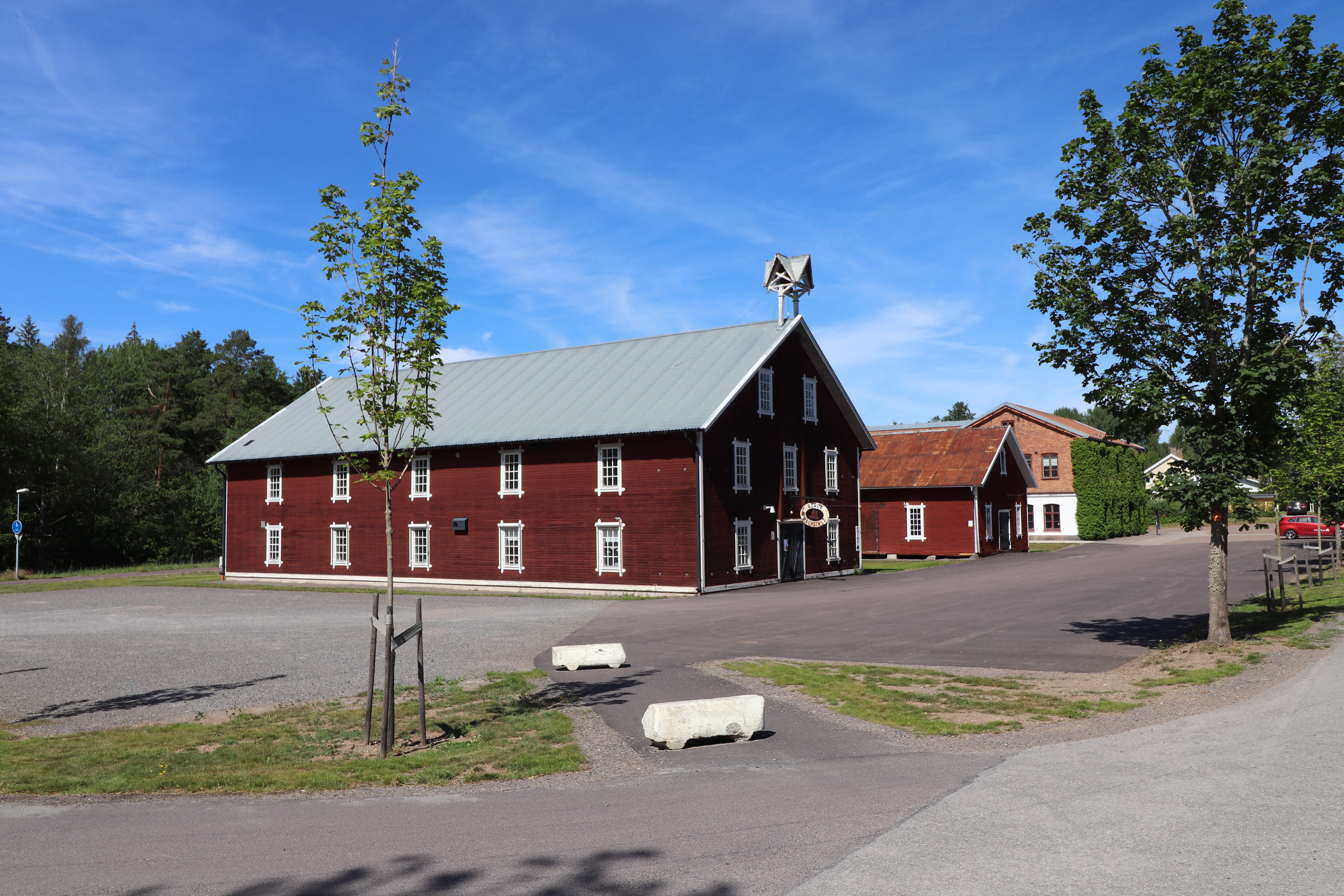
Pukeberg's Glassworks, home of the National Glass School

The National School of Glass in Orrefors (Swedish: Riksglasskolan) is an educational center focused on glass arts, design and entrepreneurship in the field of glass. It was located next to the Orrefors glassworks in the Orrefors with the same name, at the center of what is known as the Kingdom of Crystal in Småland in Southern Sweden. The glassworks in Orrefors closed in 2012. The school then moved to Pukeberg in Nybro, which has become one of the main remaining glassworks centres in Sweden.

While primarily focused on Swedish and Nordic students, the school also welcomes international students to its programs.

== History ==
Around 1960, Orrefors glassworks started a formalized glass education. The glass-related, practical parts were taught in the factory by special personnel while the theoretical subjects were taught one day a week at Nybro Vocational school.

In 1969, the municipality of Nybro took over all responsibility for the school of glass. Until 1979, the school of glass was housed in the buildings of the Orrefors glassworks. In the fall of 1979, the municipality of Nybro inaugurated the new premises of the National School of Glass near the Orrefors Glassworks.
