= Kristvallabrunn =

- Location within Kalmar Location within Sweden
- Coordinates: 56°46′N 16°03′E
- Country: Sweden
- Province: Småland
- County: Kalmar County
- Municipality: Nybro Municipality

Area
  - Total: 0.60 km^{2} (0.23 sq mi)

Population (31 December 2010)
  - Total: 246
  - Density: 409/km^{2} (1,060/sq mi)
- Time zone: UTC+1 (CET)
  - Summer (DST): UTC+2 (CEST)

Kristvallabrunn is a locality situated in Nybro Municipality, Kalmar County, Sweden with 246 inhabitants in 2010.

It lies about 30 km from Kalmar and the nearest city is Nybro. It has several woodworking industries. The village has a preschool and a primary school. Kristvallabrunn gained popularity for its health spa in the late 19th century.
