= Mats Jonasson =

Swedish glass designer

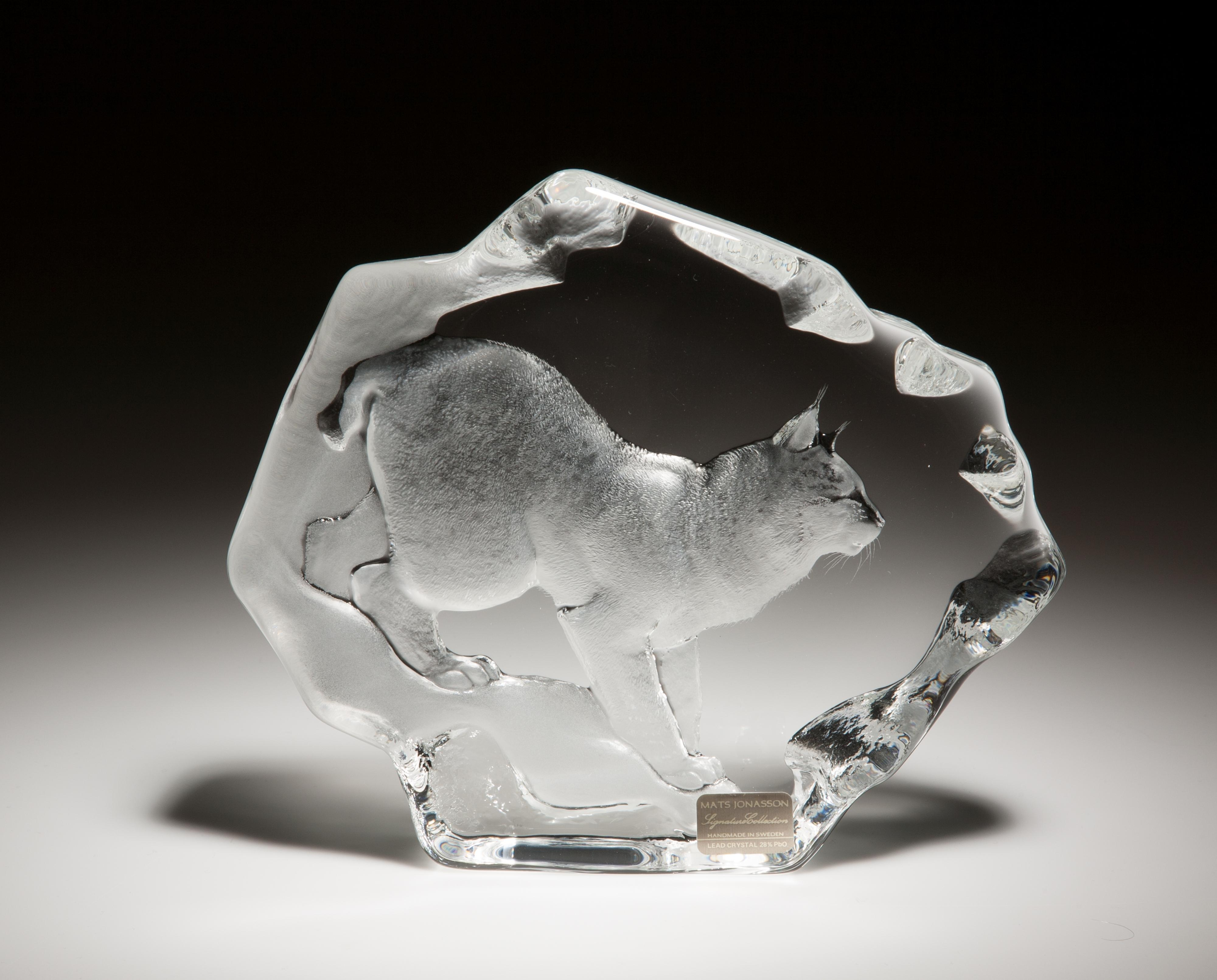
Glass relief Lynx signature collection by Mats Jonasson 1986

Mats Jonasson (born 1945) is a Swedish glass designer. Coming from a glassworkers family, he started to learn glass engraving when he was 14 years old.

He is notable for his engraved lead crystal sculptures of flowers and wildlife that are manufactured by the glassworks in Målerås, Sweden and are marketed around the world. He is represented with several works at the Småland Museum in Växjö, Sweden. One of his larger public sculptures is the Glass Angel in the children section at the Skogskyrkogården ('The Woodland Cemetery') in Ljungby.

In 1981, when Kosta Boda, the owner of Målerås glassworks, wanted to close down the production in Målerås, Jonasson and his colleagues bought the glassworks to keep it running. A few years later, Orrefors Glassworks (now merged with Kosta Boda), made a new bid for Målerås glassworks. This time the residents of Målerås, united around the local glassworks and formed a cooperation with Jonasson as CEO, to strengthen its position. Orrefors had been moving part of the production abroad, but Målerås wanted to keep the "Made in Sweden" trademark strong. In 2014, the company had over 50 employees, including designer Ludvig Löfgren who was recruited from Orrefors.

== Exhibitions, a selection ==
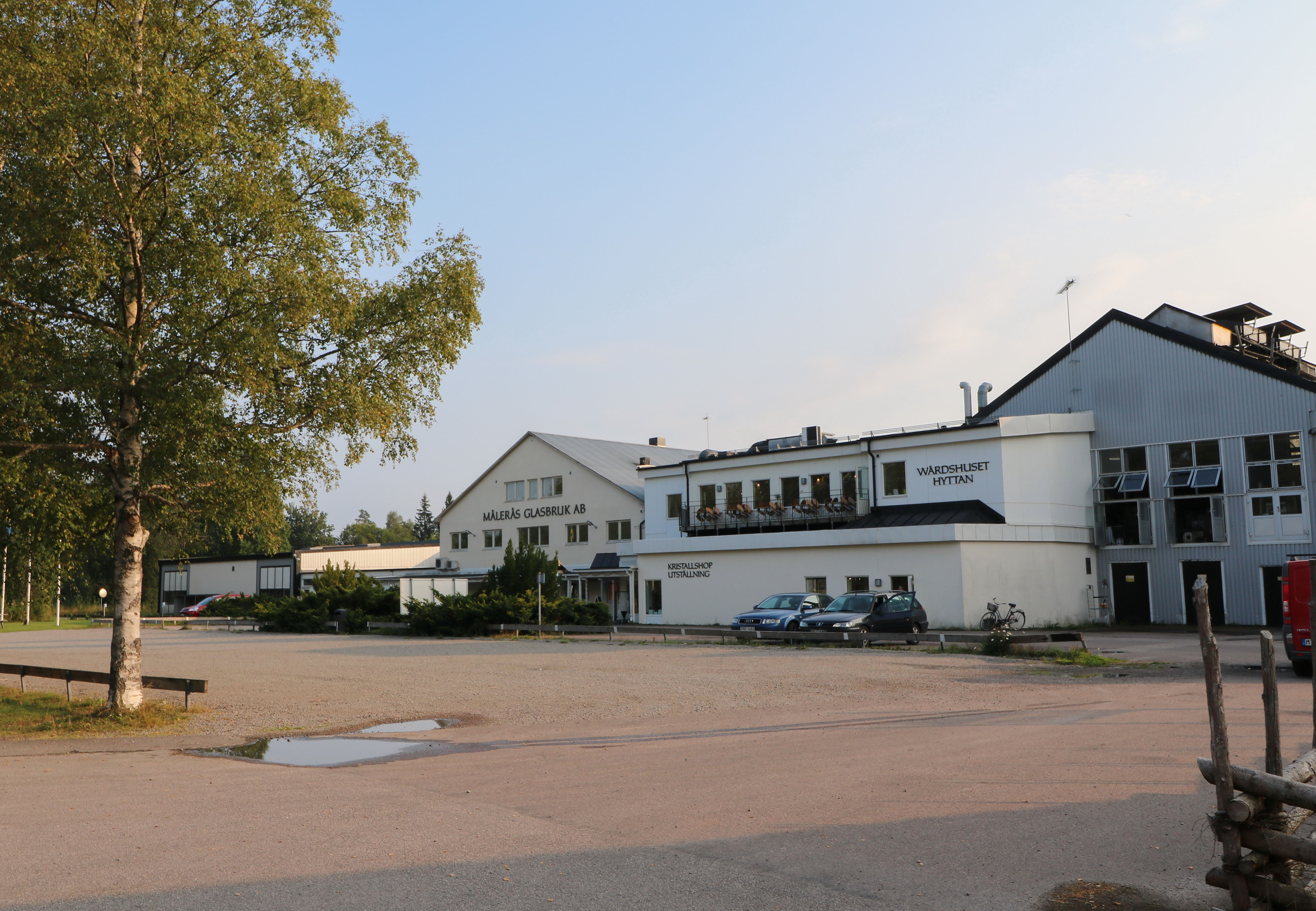
Målerås glassworks in 2019

- Pininfarinas bergrum Uddevalla, 2012
- Steninge Palace Uppsala, 2014
- Målerås glasbruk, 2019
- Vårsalongen Centrumgalleriet Gamleby, 2019
- NP33 och Galleri Sander Norrköping, 2020
- Galleri Nordica Ystad, 2021
