= Johannessen =

Johannessen is a Norwegian and Faroese patronymic surname. Notable people with the surname include:

- Astrid Johannessen (born 1978), Norwegian former football player who played for the Norway women's national football team
- Bjørnar Johannessen (born 1977), Norwegian football midfielder of Sparta Sarpsborg in the Norwegian First Division
- Guri Johannessen (1911–1972), Norwegian politician for the Labour Party
- Herman Horn Johannessen (born 1964), Norwegian sailor and Olympic medalist
- Jens Johannessen (born 1934), Norwegian painter and graphical artist
- Johannes J. Johannessen, American Medal of Honor recipients
- Kristine Martine Johannessen (1855–1933), Norwegian temperance leader and editor
- Leif Erlend Johannessen (born 1980), Norwegian chess player, and Norway's fifth International Grandmaster
- Martha Frederikke Johannessen (1907–1973), Norwegian politician for the Labour Party
- Maurice Johannessen, American politician from California and a member of the Republican Party
- Otto Johannessen (1894–1962), Norwegian gymnast who competed in the 1920 Summer Olympics
- Ørjan Johannessen (born 1985), Norwegian chef, Bocuse d'Or Europe gold medallist
- Pål Johannessen, Norwegian actor known for the role of Basse in the Norwegian Olsen Gang films
- Sigge Johannessen (1884–1974), Norwegian gymnast who competed in the 1908 Summer Olympics
- Sigurd Halvorsen Johannessen (1881–1964), Norwegian acting councilor of state in 1940–1941 and a minister 1941–1942
- Svein Johannessen (1937–2007), Norwegian chess player
- Trygve Johannessen (born 1953), Norwegian former footballer
- Viggo Johannessen (1936–2012), Norwegian civil servant
