= Alsterbro =

- Location within Kalmar Location within Sweden
- Coordinates: 56°57′N 15°55′E
- Country: Sweden
- Province: Småland
- County: Kalmar County
- Municipality: Nybro Municipality

Area
  - Total: 0.88 km^{2} (0.34 sq mi)

Population (31 December 2010)
  - Total: 422
  - Density: 480/km^{2} (1,200/sq mi)
- Time zone: UTC+1 (CET)
  - Summer (DST): UTC+2 (CEST)

Alsterbro (Swedish pronunciation: [alstɛrˈbruː]) is a locality situated in Nybro Municipality, Kalmar County, Sweden with 422 inhabitants in 2010.
