= Flerohopp =

- Location within Kalmar Location within Sweden
- Coordinates: 56°49′N 15°52′E
- Country: Sweden
- Province: Småland
- County: Kalmar County
- Municipality: Nybro Municipality

Area
  - Total: 0.52 km^{2} (0.20 sq mi)

Population (2005-12-31)
  - Total: 209
  - Density: 400/km^{2} (1,000/sq mi)
- Time zone: UTC+1 (CET)
  - Summer (DST): UTC+2 (CEST)

Flerohopp is a village situated in Nybro Municipality, Kalmar County, Sweden with 209 inhabitants in 2005.

Flerohopp grew up around the ironworks which had been founded in the town in 1725. The name Flerohopp comes from the names of the three founders of the factory: G.W. Fleetwood, G.F. Rothlieb and Caspar Dietrich Hoppenstedt. The ironworks was in use until 1880. In the same buildings the glassworks were established in 1892, which was operational until 1960. Glass was blown for laboratory work and lightbulbs.
