= Orrefors =

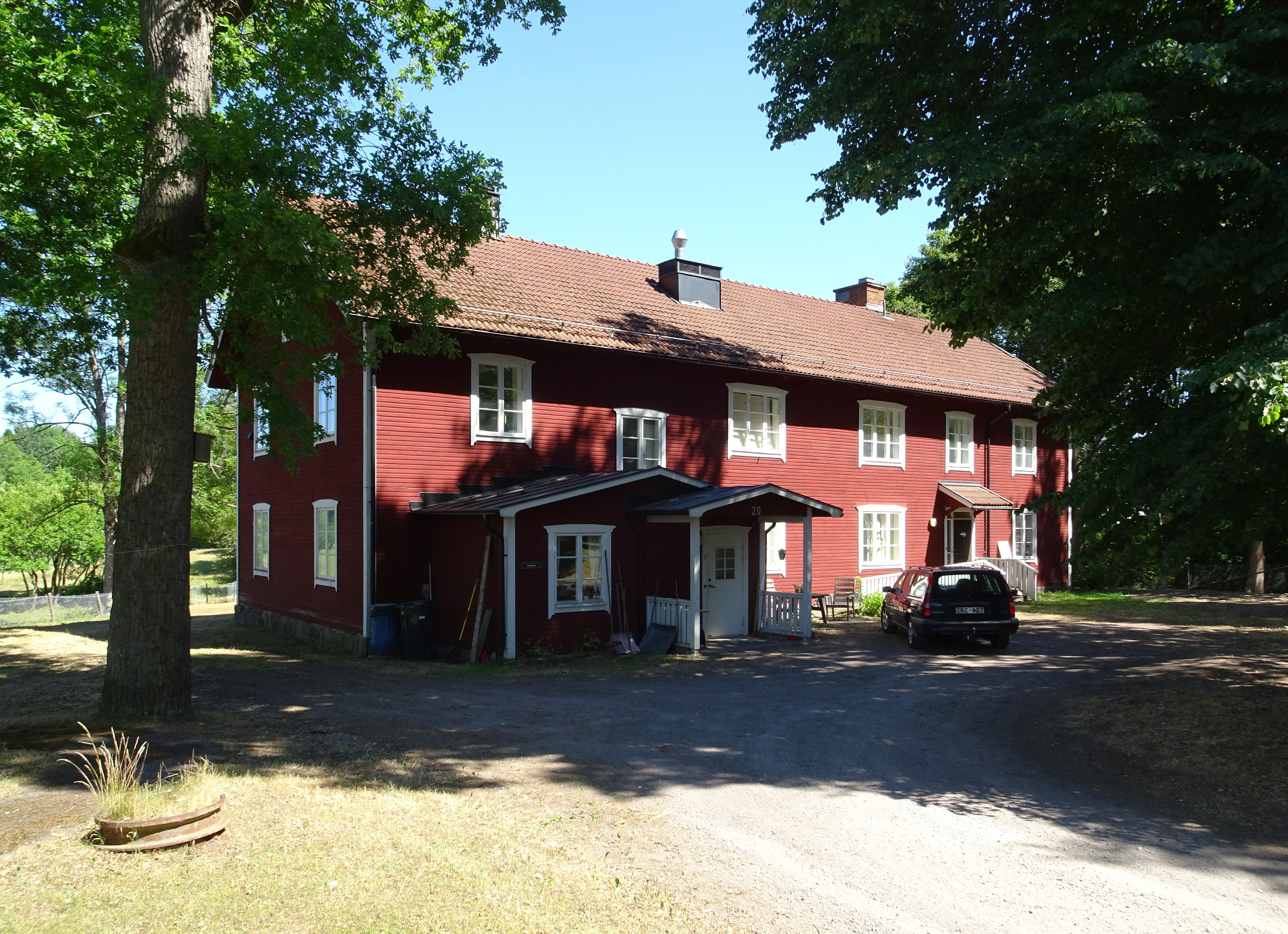

- Location within Kalmar Location within Sweden
- Coordinates: 56°50′N 15°45′E
- Country: Sweden
- Province: Småland
- County: Kalmar County
- Municipality: Nybro Municipality

Area
  - Total: 1.23 km^{2} (0.47 sq mi)

Population (31 December 2010)
  - Total: 719
  - Density: 584/km^{2} (1,510/sq mi)
- Time zone: UTC+1 (CET)
  - Summer (DST): UTC+2 (CEST)

Orrefors (Swedish pronunciation: [ɔrɛˈfɔʂː]) is a locality situated in southern Sweden and part of Nybro Municipality, Kalmar County, with 719 inhabitants in 2010. The township belongs to Hälleberga parish and is primarily famous for its glassworks with the same name. Orrefors is part of the province Småland and the area known as Kingdom of Crystal (Swedish: Glasriket, The glass realm). The area is famous for its glassworks and include the municipalities of Emmaboda, Nybro, Uppvidinge, Växjö and Lessebo in southern Sweden. Orrefors glasswork is one of the most notable with the adjacent National School of Glass and Kosta Boda.

== History ==
Orrefors was established in 1726 by cavalry ensign Lars Johan Silfversparre. He owned Orranäs manor near the lake Orranäs, and on these lands an ironwork was established. Around the ironwork a community grew which got the name Orrefors. The name is said to be a combination of two words: "Orra" and "fors". "Orra" originates from the lake Orranäs (Swedish: Orranäsasjön, The lake of Orranäs) and "fors" which in Swedish means rapid and comes from the rapid where the ironworks was established.

=== Orrefors Glassworks ===
In 1889 Orrefors Glassworks was founded and in that same year production started of technical, medical, tableware and household glass using waste wood. The glasswork replaced the less profitable iron industry. Orrefors manufactured crystal glassware and art glass. The glassworks in Orrefors closed in 2012.

== Geography ==
=== Location ===
Orrefors is located along road 31 between Nybro och Vetlanda. The closest train station is in Nybro. Orrefors used to have a railway station but it was closed down in 1985, and is a national heritage site. The locality has a bus line which is part of Kalmar municipality (Swedish: Kalmar Läns Trafik AB). The closest airports are located in Kalmar and Växjö.

== Sport ==
The sports venue in Orrefors is called Orrevallen and is the homeground for Orrefors IF. Orrevallen is a natural grass playing-field and measures 100 x 63 meters, equal to an 11 person-per-team soccer pitch.
