= Örsjö =

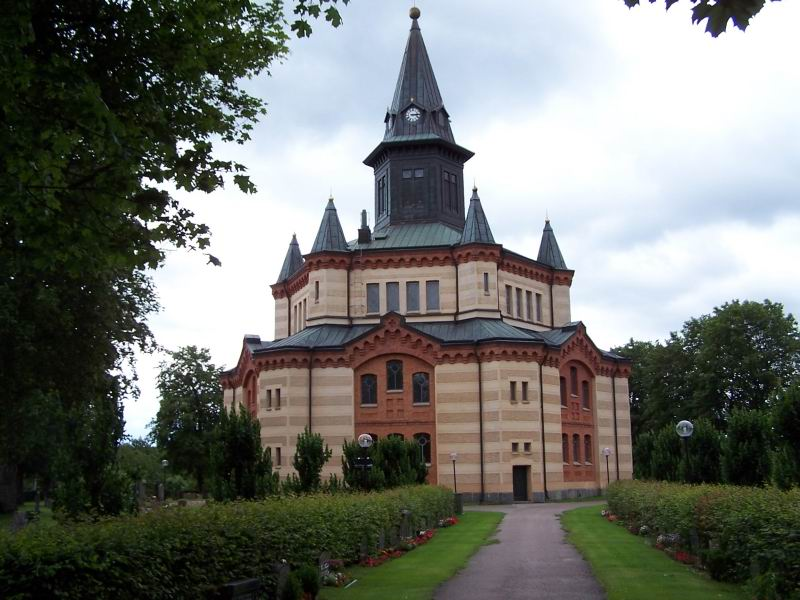
- Örsjö Church

- Location within Kalmar Location within Sweden
- Coordinates: 56°42′N 15°45′E
- Country: Sweden
- Province: Småland
- County: Kalmar County
- Municipality: Nybro Municipality

Area
  - Total: 0.73 km^{2} (0.28 sq mi)

Population (31 December 2010)
  - Total: 369
  - Density: 506/km^{2} (1,310/sq mi)
- Time zone: UTC+1 (CET)
  - Summer (DST): UTC+2 (CEST)

Örsjö is a locality situated in Nybro Municipality, Kalmar County, Sweden with 369 inhabitants in 2010.
