= Bäckebo =

Swedish locality

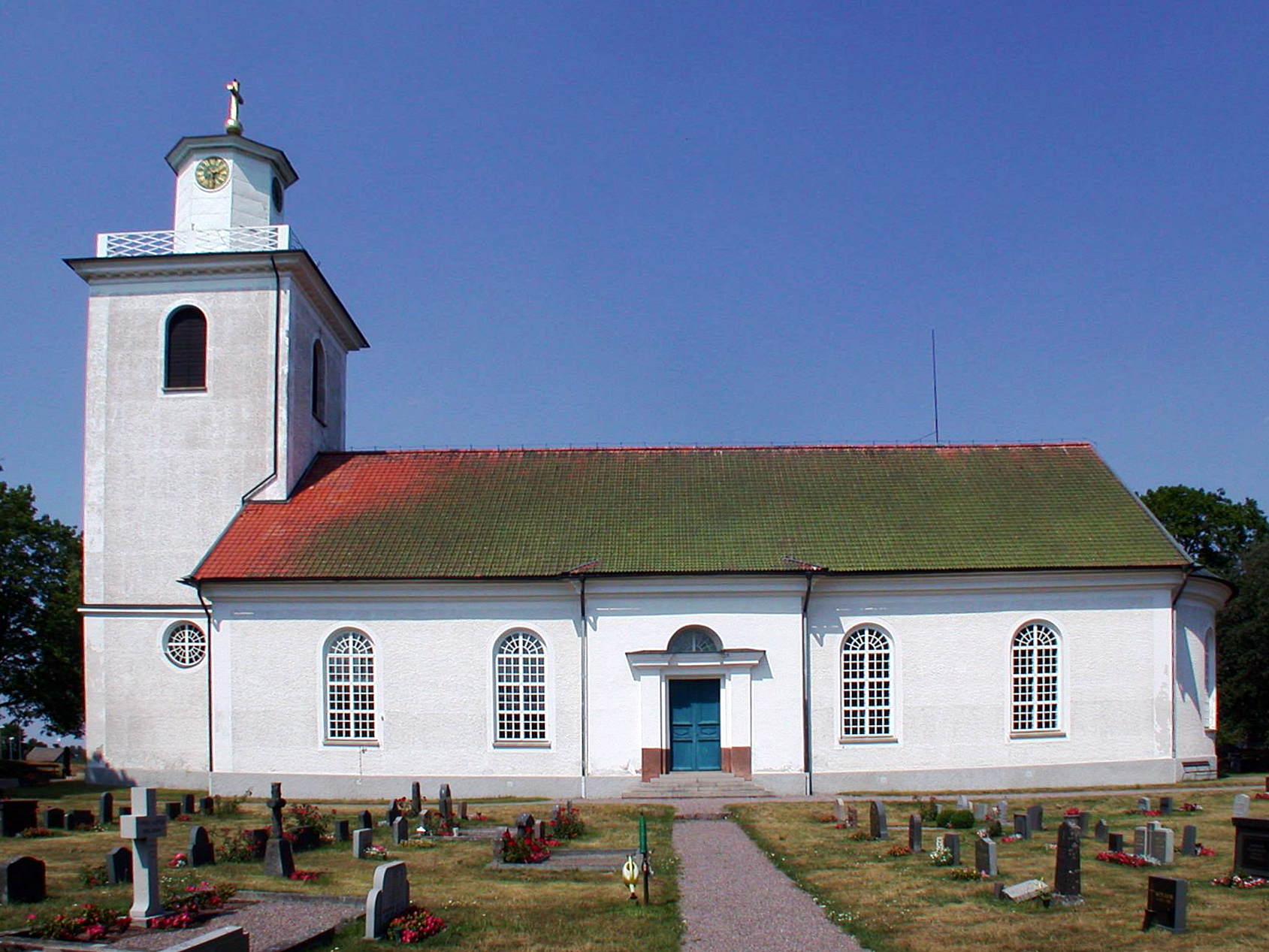
- Bäckebo church

- Location within Kalmar Location within Sweden
- Coordinates: 56°53′N 16°04′E
- Country: Sweden
- Province: Småland
- County: Kalmar County
- Municipality: Nybro Municipality

Area
  - Total: 0.84 km^{2} (0.32 sq mi)

Population (31 December 2010)
  - Total: 219
  - Density: 260/km^{2} (670/sq mi)
- Time zone: UTC+1 (CET)
  - Summer (DST): UTC+2 (CEST)

Bäckebo is a locality situated in Nybro Municipality, Kalmar County, Sweden, with 219 inhabitants in 2010. It is known for the World War II Bäckebo rocket incident, in which the test flight of a German V-2 rocket, bound for Denmark, went astray and exploded above a cornfield near the hamlet of Gräsdals.

== Gallery ==
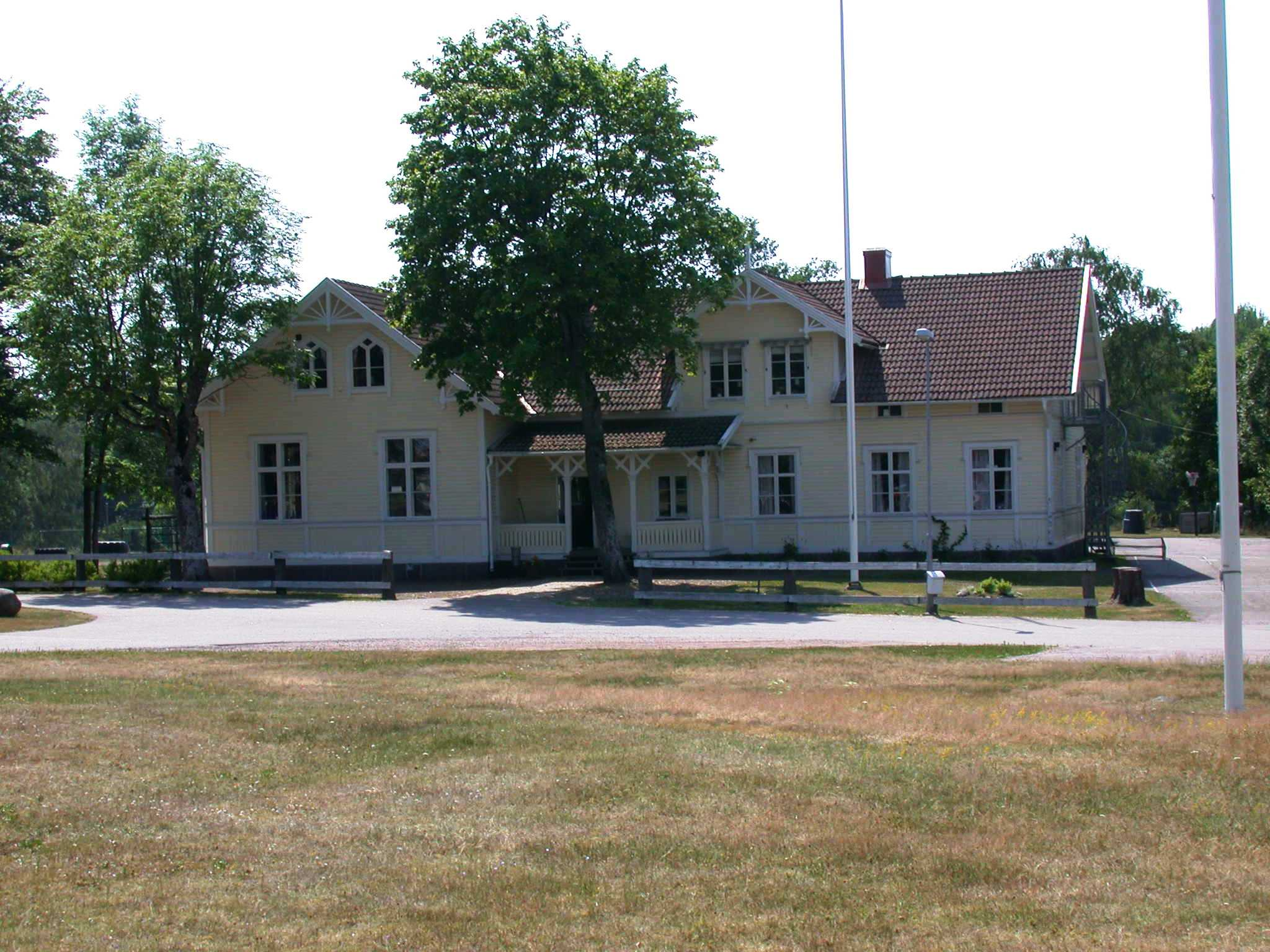
Bäckebo school

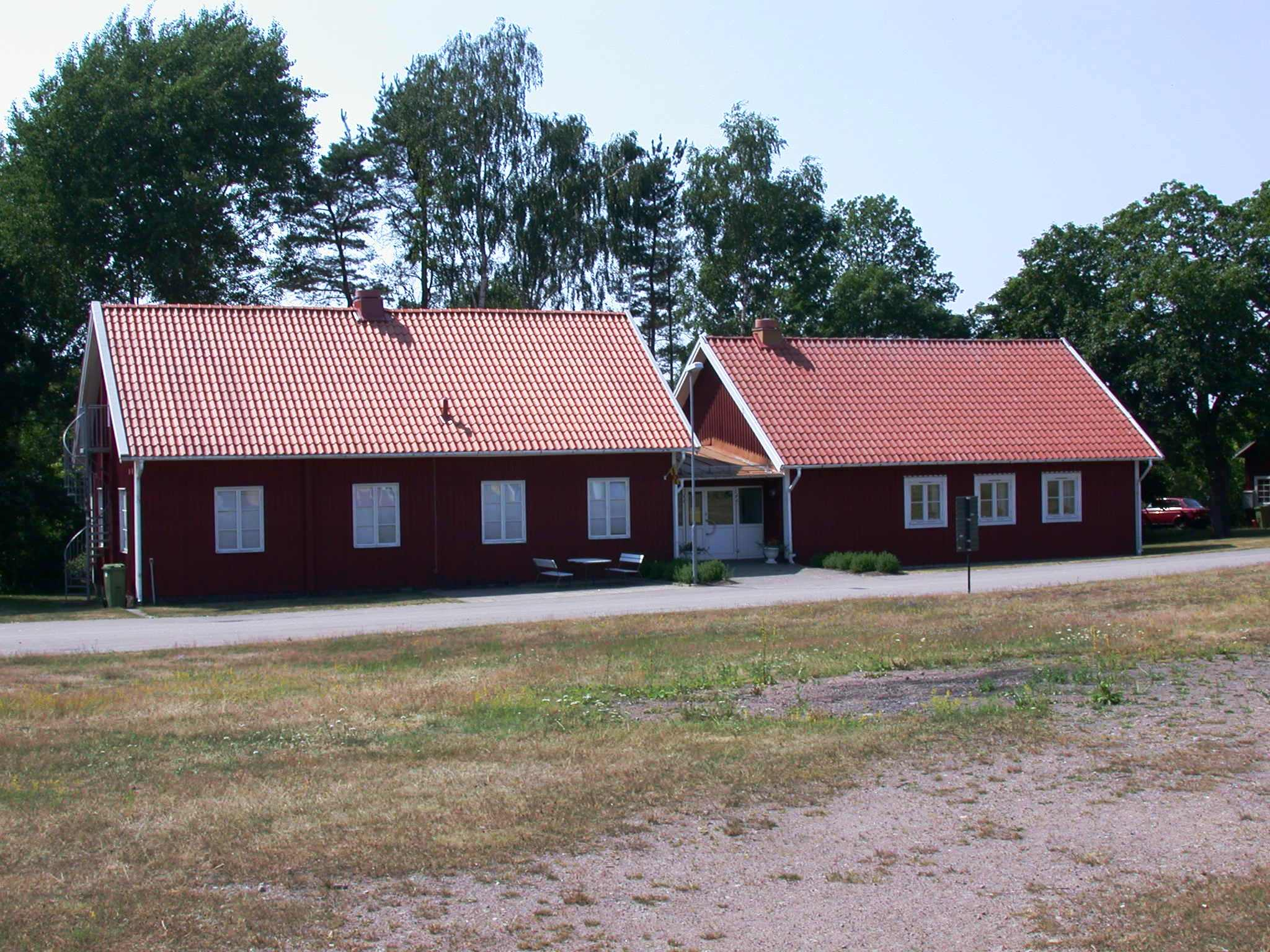
Bäckebo parish hall
