= Edward Hald =

Swedish sculptor

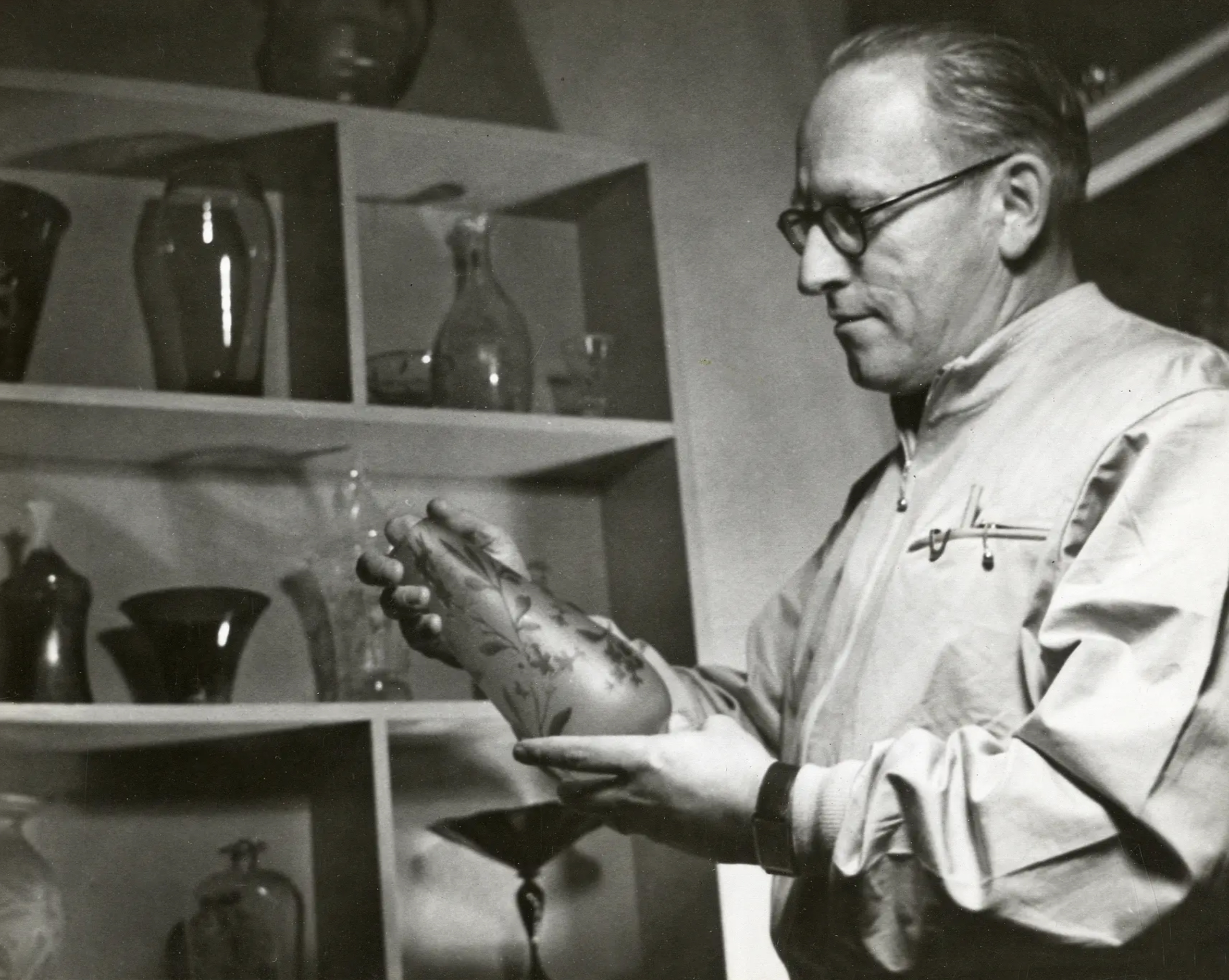
- Hald viewing the first "Graal glass" vase from the collection at Orrefors Glassworks ca 1938-1940.
- Born: 17 September 1883; Stockholm, Sweden
- Died: 4 July 1980 (aged 96); Stockholm, Sweden
- Occupation: Sculptor

Edward Hald (17 September 1883 – 4 July 1980) was a Swedish sculptor. His work was part of the art competitions at the 1932 Summer Olympics and the 1936 Summer Olympics.

== Works, a selection ==
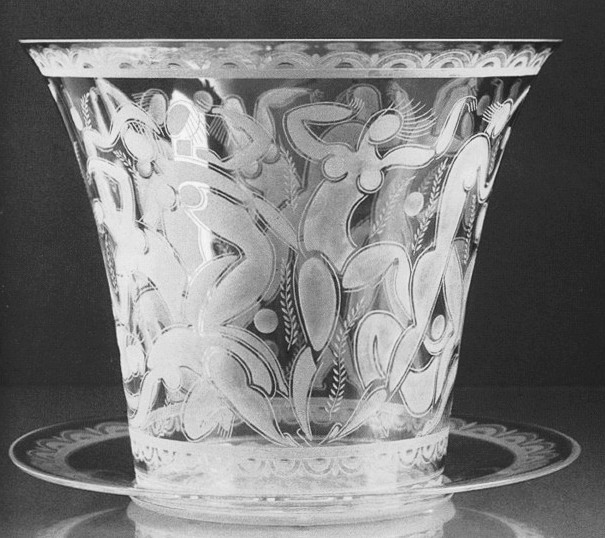
Girls playing with ball, 1919

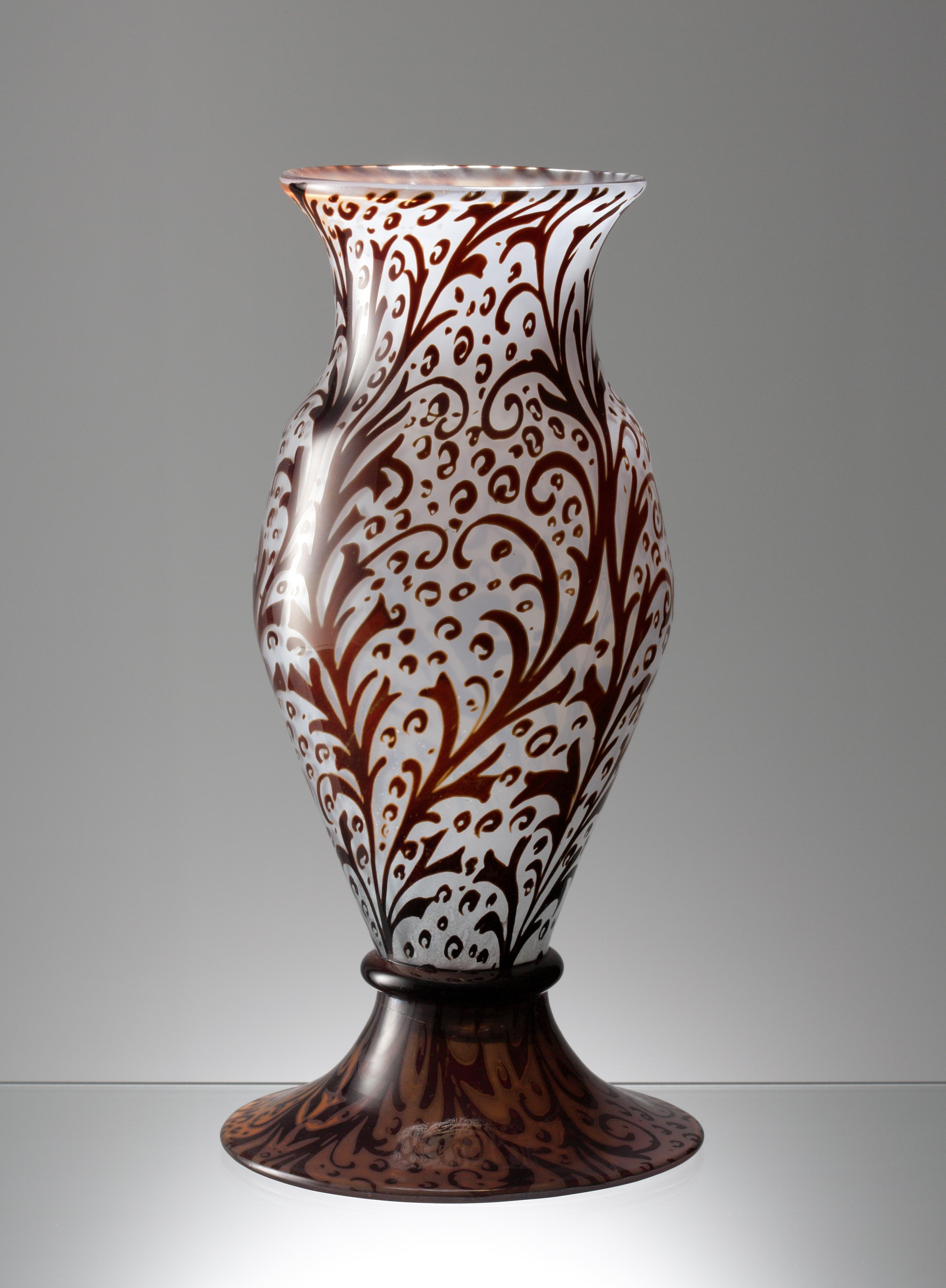
Graalvas, designed by Edward Hald and made by Knut Bergqvist, 1919

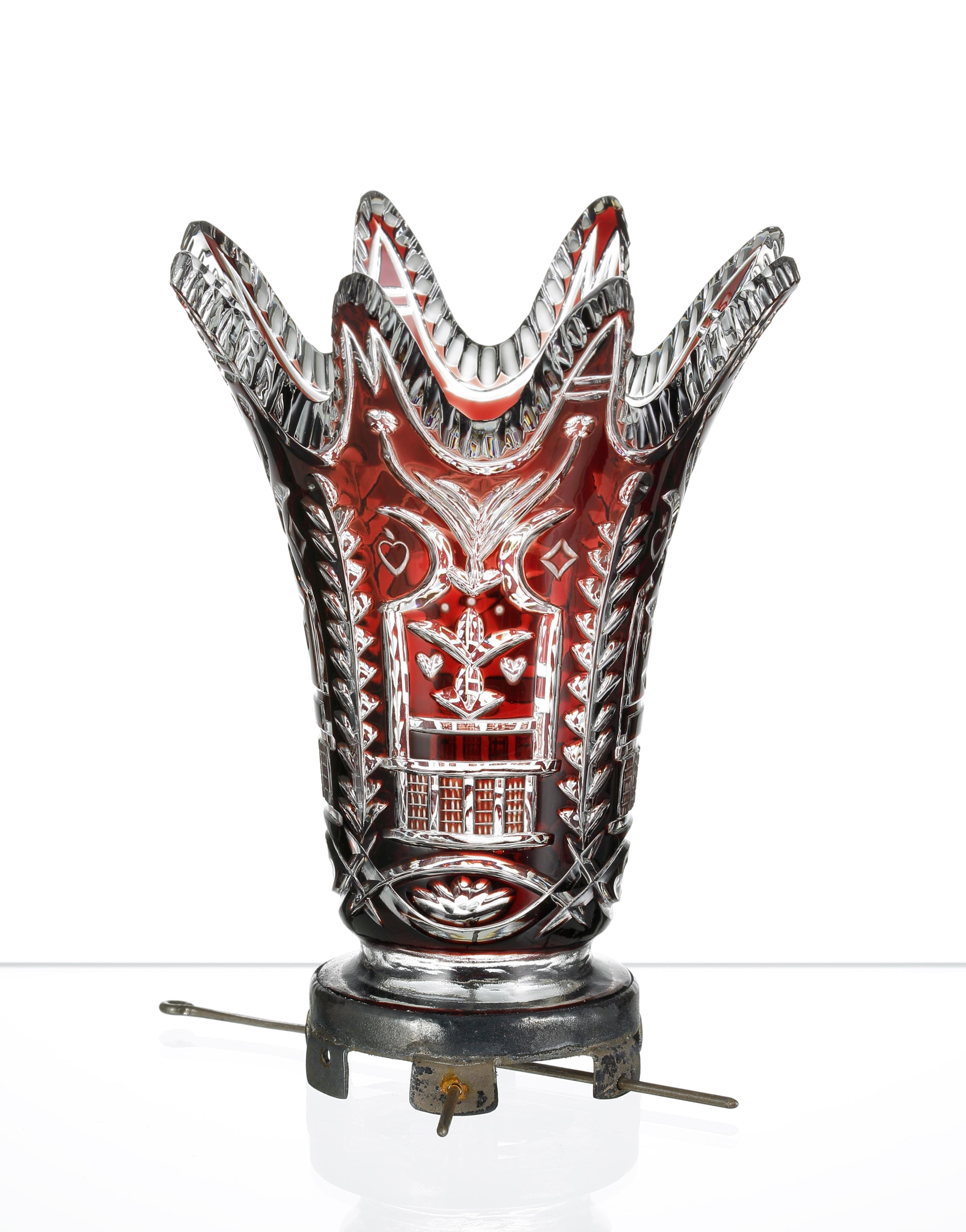
Bridal crown, glass and silver, made for his daughter's wedding in 1946
