= Per B. Sundberg =

Swedish ceramic and glass artist

Per Bertil Sundberg (born 2 April 1964) is a Swedish ceramic and glass artist. Until 2005 he worked at Orrefors glassworks, and has subsequently been a professor at Konstfack (University College of Arts, Crafts and Design) and an independent artist.

Sundberg studied at Capellagården and Konstfack. In 2004, he held a solo exhibition at the Röhsska Museum in Gothenburg, called "Greatest Hits 1983-2004". In 2005 he received the first Form scholarship from the Swedish Visual Arts Fund. In summer 2011, a solo exhibition was dedicated to his pottery at the Gustavsberg Art Gallery in Stockholm. In November 2014, Sundberg was awarded the Swedish Visual Arts Fund Scholarship.

== Artistic expression ==
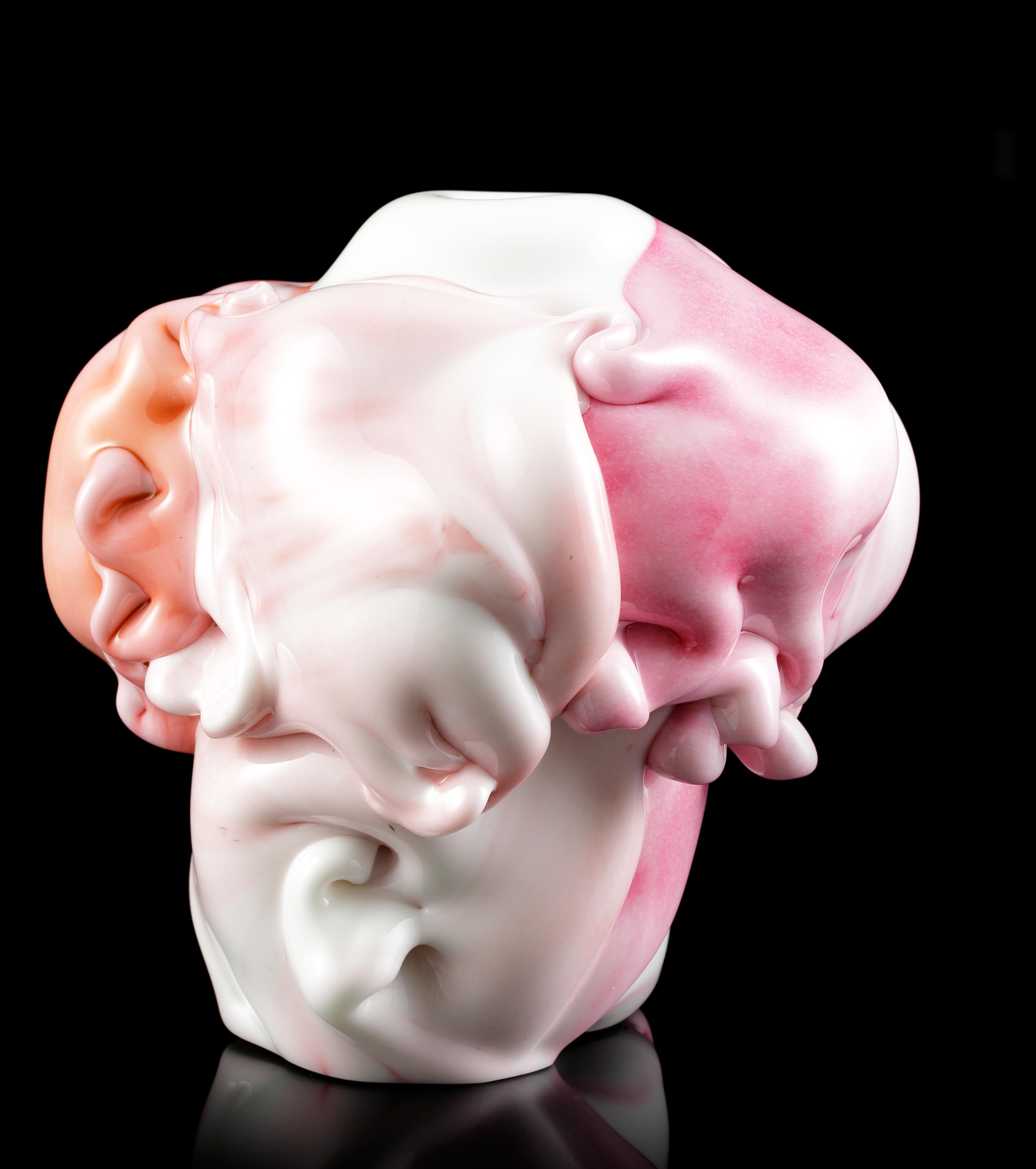
Pink glass vase made for Orrefors Glassworks, 1998

A starting point in much of Sundberg's artwork is nature. Animals and plants are present in often unexpected juxtapositions; sometimes humorously created, sometimes more thoughtfully. In his glasswork, Sundberg often uses inset images in the form of decals from the old Gustavsberg porcelain factory and with properties to withstand high temperatures. The inset images contrast with one another, creating tension in the work. Sundberg also uses decals in his ceramic art, as well as ceramic figurines from flea markets. Unexpected encounters between sculpted nature and combinations of figurines take place. In some works, both in glass and ceramics, Sundberg discusses the concept of function. Is a special function associated with a particular shape? is one of the questions he investigates. Common to Sundberg's oeuvre is the sculptural expression, which from around 2011 has become even more articulated.

== Education ==
Per B. Sundberg grew up in Huddinge, south of Stockholm, where he early showed interest in creative expression, including in textile. Sundberg applied and was accepted to the pottery division at Capellagården in Vickleby 1983-85. In the years 1985-1992 he studied glass and ceramics at Konstfack in Stockholm, with a break in 1988 to study at the Pilchuck Glass School in Seattle.

== Work ==
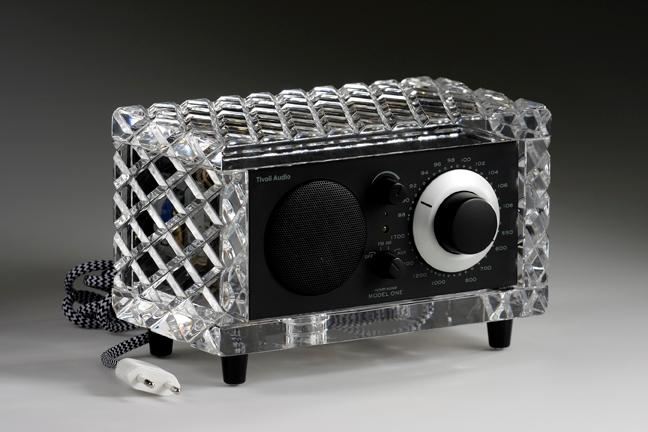
Crystal radio made for Orrefors Glassworks, 2004

After completing his studies Per B. Sundberg established himself as glass and ceramic artist. He creates mostly unique art objects or public art, since 2005 full-time in his own studio in Gustavsberg. After training at Konstfack, he and some fellow students established a glass studio on the islets Fjäderholmarna, at the inlet to Stockholm. Here Sundberg blew glass, inter alia together with his colleagues Gunilla Kihlgren and Mårten Medbo. During the years 1994-2005, Per B. Sundberg was an employee at Orrefors glassworks. His glass art also attracted international attention and purchases, including by the Victoria & Albert Museum in London. During his time at Orrefors glassworks, Sundberg developed new glass techniques. The Fabula technique is based on Orrefors classic graal technique. Heat-resistant decals are pasted on a cylindrical glass blank. The glass blank is heated, overlaid with clear glass and blown to the desired basic shape. Still hot, the object is then formed using metal tools. Artistic themes are flora and fauna, as well as celebrities. The Litograal technique is similar, in which the decals are replaced with black and white copies from comic books, often of a sexual nature. Sometimes Sundberg makes the glass surface opaque and polishes windows into the subject. In connection with the transfer of ownership of the Orrefors Kosta Boda glassworks in 2005, Sundberg left Orrefors and was hired as a professor at the Konstfack Department of Design, Crafts and Arts. In parallel with the work at Konstfack, Sundberg has worked in his own studio at the old premises of the Gustavsberg porcelain factory. When operations ceased at the factory, a number of independent artists moved into the premises, including Sundberg. An important element in Sundberg's artistic process is to use materials that others have left: clays, glazes, decals and figurines. These then form the palette of his creativity. Sundberg is constantly looking for new expressions and to test the limits of materials. In the studio, he has developed new ceramic materials, including clays and glazes from the old factory. Sundberg combines figurines, found at flea markets, with a self-constructed foundation. A number of firings with different glazes follows. Glazes are thus part of the sculpted expression.

== Selected exhibitions ==
(Regarding Exhibitions please see Danius, Sara (2006), p. 95, Wayback Machine and Peres, Maria (2011), p. 23)

- 1988 Gallery De 20, Växjö
- 1996 Orrefors Museum, Orrefors
- 1997 Olle Olsson Hagalund Museum, Solna
- 2000 Gallery Kamras, Borgholm
- 2000 Stockholm New, New York
- 2003 Gallery Orrefors Kosta Boda, Stockholm
- 2004 "Beauty and the Beast", Craft Council, London
- 2004 VIDA art gallery, Öland
- 2004 "Greatest Hits 1983-2004", Röhsska Museum, Gothenburg
- 2005 "Concept Design", Nationalmuseum, Stockholm
- 2006-2011 Voices, Swedish Institute touring exhibition, Germany, France, Belgium and the US
- 2009 Hands on, Dunkers kulturhus, Helsingborg
- 2009 State of Things, Kulturhuset, Stockholm
- 2011 Per B. Sundberg, Gustavsberg Art Gallery, Gustavsberg
- 2012 Per B. Sundberg, Bomuldsfabriken Kunsthall, Arendal, Norway
- 2012 La galerie NeC nilsson et chiglien, Paris

== Public works ==
(Regarding Public works please see Danius, Sara (2006), p. 95, Wayback Machine and Peres, Maria (2011), p. 23)

- 2003 Neon chandeliers, Family housing, Hammarby Sjöstad, Stockholm
- 2005 Altarpiece and chandeliers, Church of Light, Hallunda, Stockholm
- 2006 "Something that did not turn out but someone moved in", BUP South General Hospital, Stockholm. Collaboration with artist Cecilia Elde (b. 1964)
- 2006 New coat of arms for the Swedish Riksdag (Parliament), Riksdag Chamber, Stockholm. Cooperation with Ingegerd Råman (b. 1943)
- 2006 Light installation, Akershus University Hospital, Lilleström, Norway.
- 2009 "Painting and ceramic sculpture in communication", Tussmötegården, Stureby, Stockholm. Collaboration with artist Cecilia Elde
- 2010 "Crystal Tree", Elinebo, Helsingborg
- Represented inter alia at Nationalmuseum, Röhsska Museum, Magasin III, Småland Museum, Montreal Museum of Fine Arts, Canada, National Museum of Decorative Arts, Buenos Aires, Argentina, Danish Museum of Art & Design, Copenhagen, Denmark, Victoria & Albert Museum, London, UK

== Sources and literature ==
- Britton, Claes (2002). Pelle is different. Stockholm new (Stockholm). 2002 (12), pp. 66–68
- Danius, Sara (2006). Voices: contemporary ceramic art from Sweden: Frida Fjellman, Renata Francescon, Eva Hild, Pontus Lindvall, Mårten Medbo, Annasofia Mååg, Gustaf Nordenskiöld, Kjell Rylander, Per B Sundberg, Kennet Williamson. Stockholm: Carlsson
- Helgeson, Susanne (2003). Tunggung: Glass that rocks. Form (Stockholm). 2003 (99: 6), pp. 32–41
- Littman, Brett (2000). Swedish peep show. Glass: The Urban Art Glass Quarterly (New York, N.Y.). 2000 (80), pp. 44–51
- Madestrand, Bo (2004). Rebel at Orrefors. Dagens Nyheter (Stockholm). 2004-09-24
- Nanfeldt, Michael (2004). Per B. Sundberg Greatest Hits 1983-2004: an exhibition in collaboration with Orrefors. Gothenburg: Röhsska Museum
- Orrefors (2000). Orrefors Stockholm New York: [Per B. Sundberg, Ingegerd Råman]: [exhibition Altman Building, New York, 9–12 May 2000]. Stockholm
- Peres, Maria (2011). Per B. Sundberg. Gustavsberg: Gustavsberg Art Gallery
- Weibull, Nina (1996). Glaset dansar: Glass dancing. Form (Stockholm). 1996 (92: 6), pp. 26–33
