= Joensen =

Joensen is a surname. Notable people with the surname include:

- Bodil Joensen (1944–1985), Danish pornographic actress
- Sámuel Joensen-Mikines (1906–1979), Faroese impressionist artist
- Edmund Joensen (born 1944), Faroese politician
- Gregers Joensen (1835–1897), Faroese teacher and politician
- Hallur Joensen, Faroese country singer
- Heri Joensen (born 1973), Faroese musician
- Meinhardt Joensen, Faroese soccer player
- Ove Joensen (1948–1987), Faroese seaman and adventurer
- Pál Joensen (born 1990), Faroese elite swimmer
- Páll Mohr Joensen (born 1986), Faroese soccer player
- Poul F. Joensen (1898–1970), Faroese poet
- William Michael Joensen (born 1960), Bishop of the Catholic Diocese of Des Moines, USA
- Rannva Joensen (born 1986), Faroese former child star and singer

Joensen is the most common surname in the Faroe Islands. As of 1 January 2015 the number of people in the Faroe Islands with the surname Joensen was 2,365.

== See also ==
- Sámal Joensen-Mikines (1906–1979), Faroese painter
