= Nybro Municipality =

Nybro Municipality Nybro kommun
- Municipality
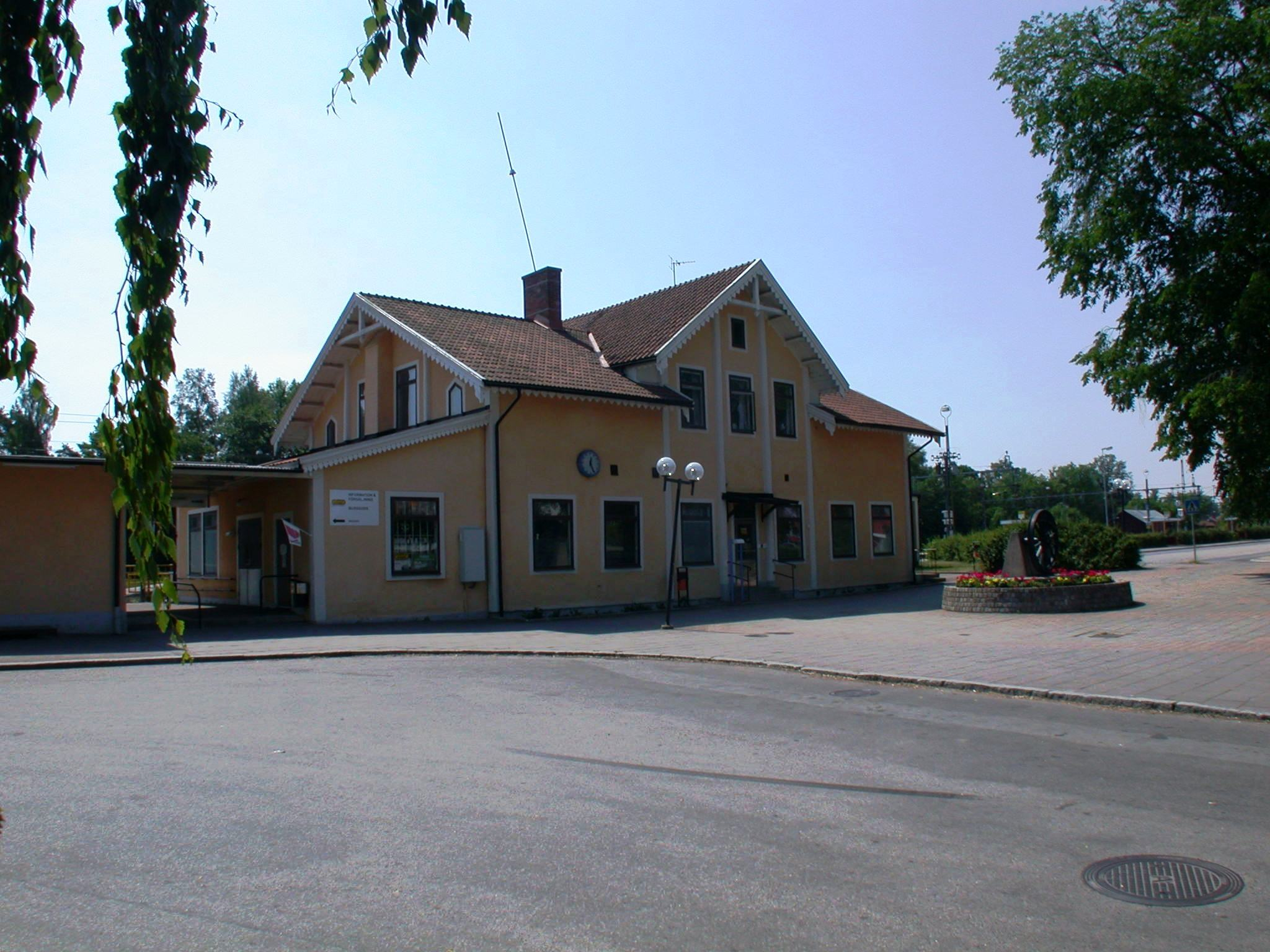
- Nybro Railway Station

- Coat of arms

- Coordinates: 56°44′N 15°54′E
- Country: Sweden
- County: Kalmar County
- Seat: Nybro

Area
  - Total: 1,201.54 km^{2} (463.92 sq mi)
  - Land: 1,171.69 km^{2} (452.39 sq mi)
  - Water: 29.85 km^{2} (11.53 sq mi)
- Area as of 1 January 2014.

Population (30 June 2025)
  - Total: 19,902
  - Density: 16.986/km^{2} (43.993/sq mi)
- Time zone: UTC+1 (CET)
  - Summer (DST): UTC+2 (CEST)
- ISO 3166 code: SE
- Province: Småland
- Municipal code: 0881
- Website: www.nybro.se

Nybro Municipality (Swedish: Nybro kommun) is a municipality in Kalmar County, south-eastern Sweden, with its seat in the town Nybro.

The amalgamation of the City of Nybro (instituted in 1932) with its surrounding municipalities took place in 1969.

The municipality was inhabited by a few hundred people until the railways came in the late 19th century, and the town Nybro was in its location between Kalmar on the east coast and Gothenburg on the west coast; later also on the railway from Kalmar and Malmö in the south-west. Until then Nybro mostly consisted of minor industries, including a match factory, marked by its traditionally Småland forest nature, largely unsuitable for agriculture.

Nybro Municipality is in the eastern part of the "Kingdom of Crystal" area (Swedish: Glasriket), that covers a total of four municipalities.

== Localities ==
There are nine urban areas (also called localities, Swedish: tätorter) in Nybro Municipality.

In the table the localities are listed according to the size of the population as of December 31, 2005. The municipal seat is in bold characters.

#	Locality	Population
1	**Nybro**	12,598
2	Orrefors	696
3	Alsterbro	462
4	Örsjö	373
5	Kristvallabrunn	262
6	Flygsfors	255
7	Bäckebo	241
8	Målerås	228
9	Flerohopp	209

== Demographics ==
This is a demographic table based on Nybro Municipality's electoral districts in the 2022 Swedish general election sourced from SVT's election platform, in turn taken from SCB official statistics.

In total there were 20,252 residents, including 15,131 Swedish citizens of voting age. 45.9% voted for the left coalition and 52.6% for the right coalition. Indicators are in percentage points except population totals and income.

Location	Residents	Citizen adults	Left vote	Right vote	Employed	Swedish parents	Foreign heritage	Income SEK	Degree
Location			%	%					
Bäckebo	688	543	39.1	60.0	78	90	10	22,982	26
Hälleberga	1,609	1,130	44.8	52.9	69	71	29	20,748	23
Kristvalla	638	528	39.5	58.4	83	89	11	24,166	31
Kråksmåla	651	485	45.6	53.9	83	81	19	22,290	30
Madesjö 1	1,832	1,379	44.8	54.4	88	91	9	26,486	34
Madesjö 2	1,667	1,245	40.2	58.5	86	92	8	25,989	33
Nybro 1	1,765	1,528	52.5	45.8	72	76	24	18,533	31
Nybro 2	1,590	1,176	52.2	46.6	76	67	33	21,045	30
Nybro 3	1,857	1,041	65.5	28.9	54	32	68	15,054	23
Nybro 4	1,543	1,223	48.3	50.1	73	75	25	20,900	31
Nybro 5	1,712	1,299	43.4	55.7	84	79	21	26,050	36
Nybro 6	1,635	1,302	45.2	54.1	87	87	13	27,124	40
Nybro 7	2,102	1,524	44.3	55.1	88	85	15	26,919	36
Örsjö-Oskar	963	728	36.3	61.8	84	88	12	24,653	31
Source: SVT

== See also ==
- The Bäckebo Bomb
