= Kristine Martine Johannessen =

Norwegian temperance leader and magazine editor (1855–1933)

Kristine Martine Johannessen (alternate spelling, Johannesen; 1855–1933) was a Norwegian temperance leader and editor. She served as President of the Norske Kvinders Totalavholdsselskab (Norwegian Woman's Total Abstinence Society).

== Early life and education ==
Kristine Martine Johannessen was born in Bergen, Norway, on 14 April 1855. Her parents were Peter Johan Johannesen and Berthe Marie Olsen.

She was educated at a private day-school for girls in her native city.

== Career ==
About 1885, she and her sister opened a draper's shop in Bergen, and remained in that business until about 1915.

She became a total abstainer in 1890, and was for two years a member of a local women's temperance organization. Upon the introduction of the Woman's Christian Temperance Union (WCTU) into Norway, she joined that body and soon (1892) was chosen a leader of a local branch of the Union. With the exception of ten years (1897–1907) when she was president of the Norske Kvinders Totalavholdsselskab (Norwegian Woman's Total Abstinence Society), she served as president of the Bergen branch of the WCTU until 1921. She was several times a member of the joint committee of total-abstinence workers in Bergen. In 1901, she was elected the first representative of the temperance party to serve in the Bergen Town Council, holding that office for three years.

For four years (1901–05), she was editor of the Norwegian columns of the Nordisk Kristelig Avholdsblad, a temperance publication issued from Copenhagen, Denmark.

== Death ==
Kristine Martine Johannessen died on 27 June 1933.
