= Jonassen Rocks =

The Jonassen Rocks (54°41′S 36°22′W) are a small group of rocks lying off the south coast of South Georgia, 1 nautical mile (2 km) west of the south end of Novosilski Bay. They were surveyed by the South Georgia Survey in the period 1951–57, and named by the UK Antarctic Place-Names Committee for Idar Jonassen (1889–1933), a gunner of the Compañía Argentina de Pesca, Grytviken, 1924–33.
