= Simon Gate =

Swedish sculptor

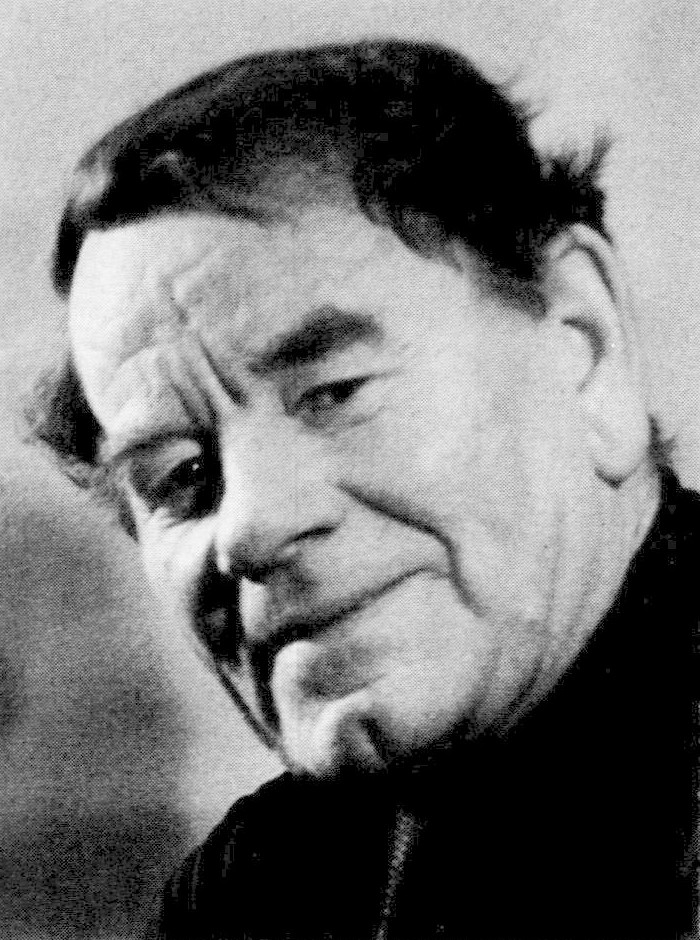
- Born: 10 March 1883; Hjo, Sweden
- Died: 11 May 1945 (aged 62); Orrefors, Sweden
- Occupation: Sculptor

Simon Gate (10 March 1883 – 11 May 1945) was a Swedish sculptor. His work was part of the art competitions at the 1932 Summer Olympics and the 1936 Summer Olympics.

== Works, a selection ==
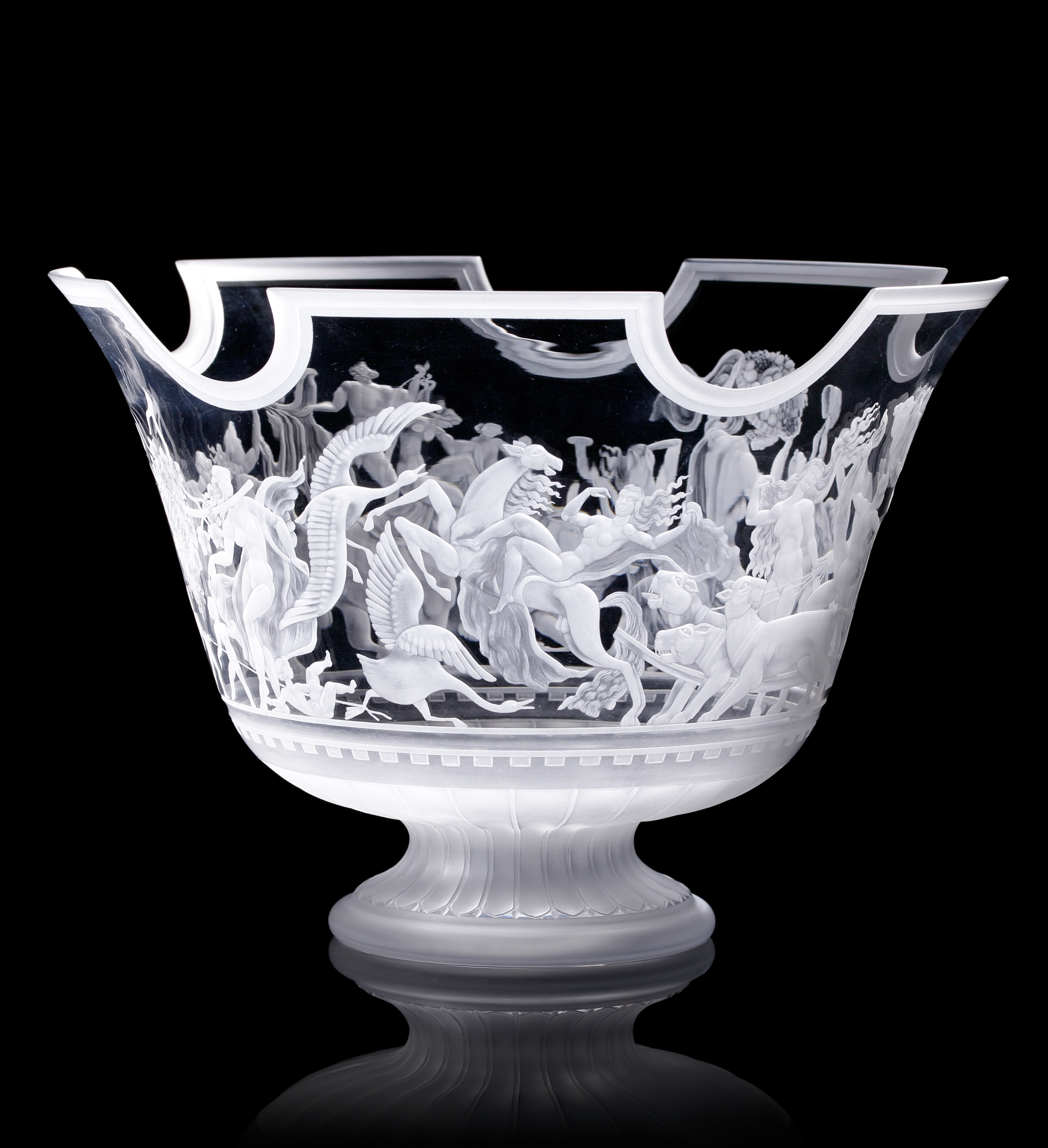
Bacchuståget 1925

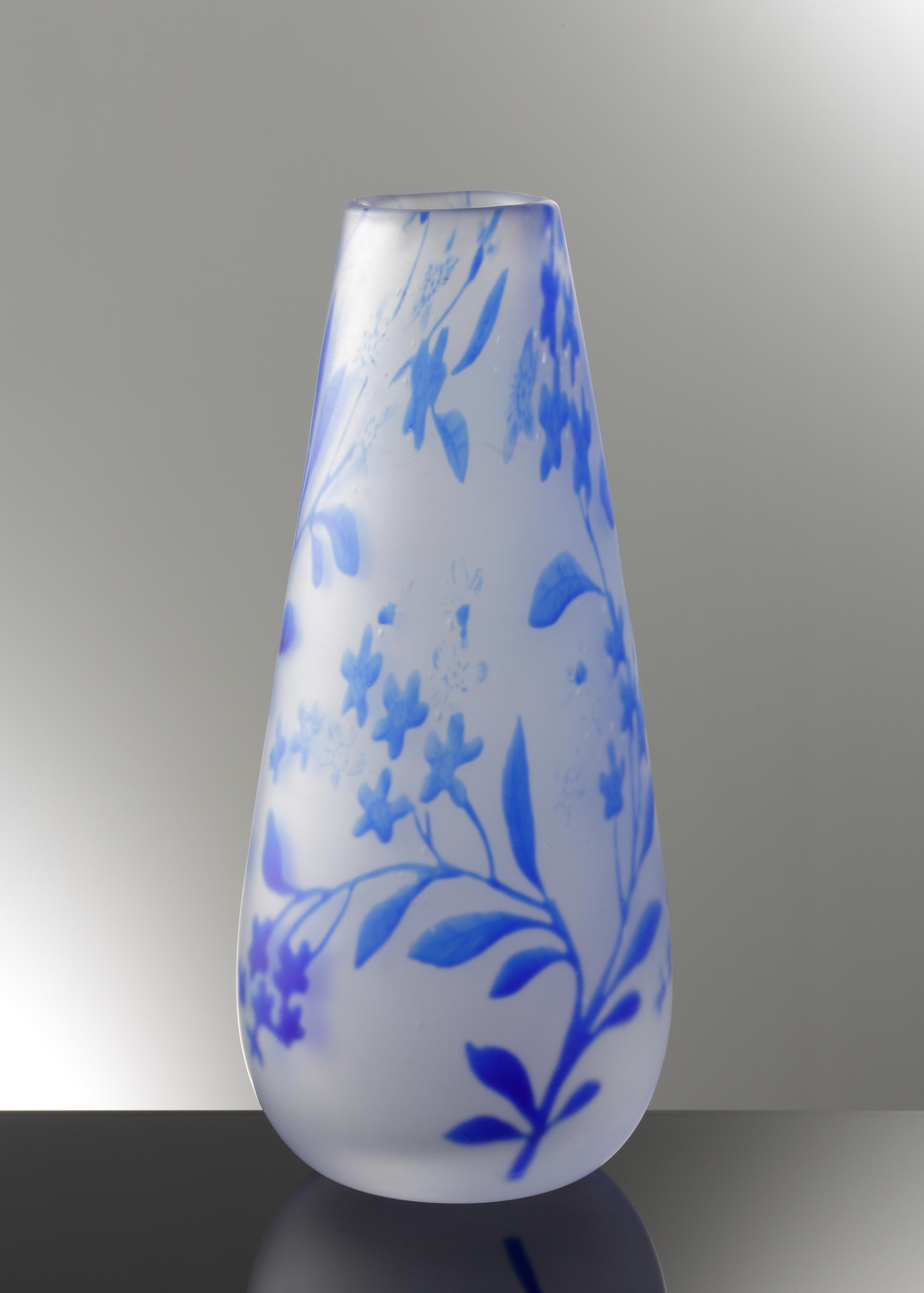
Graal Orrefors KB - HW No 1, 1916

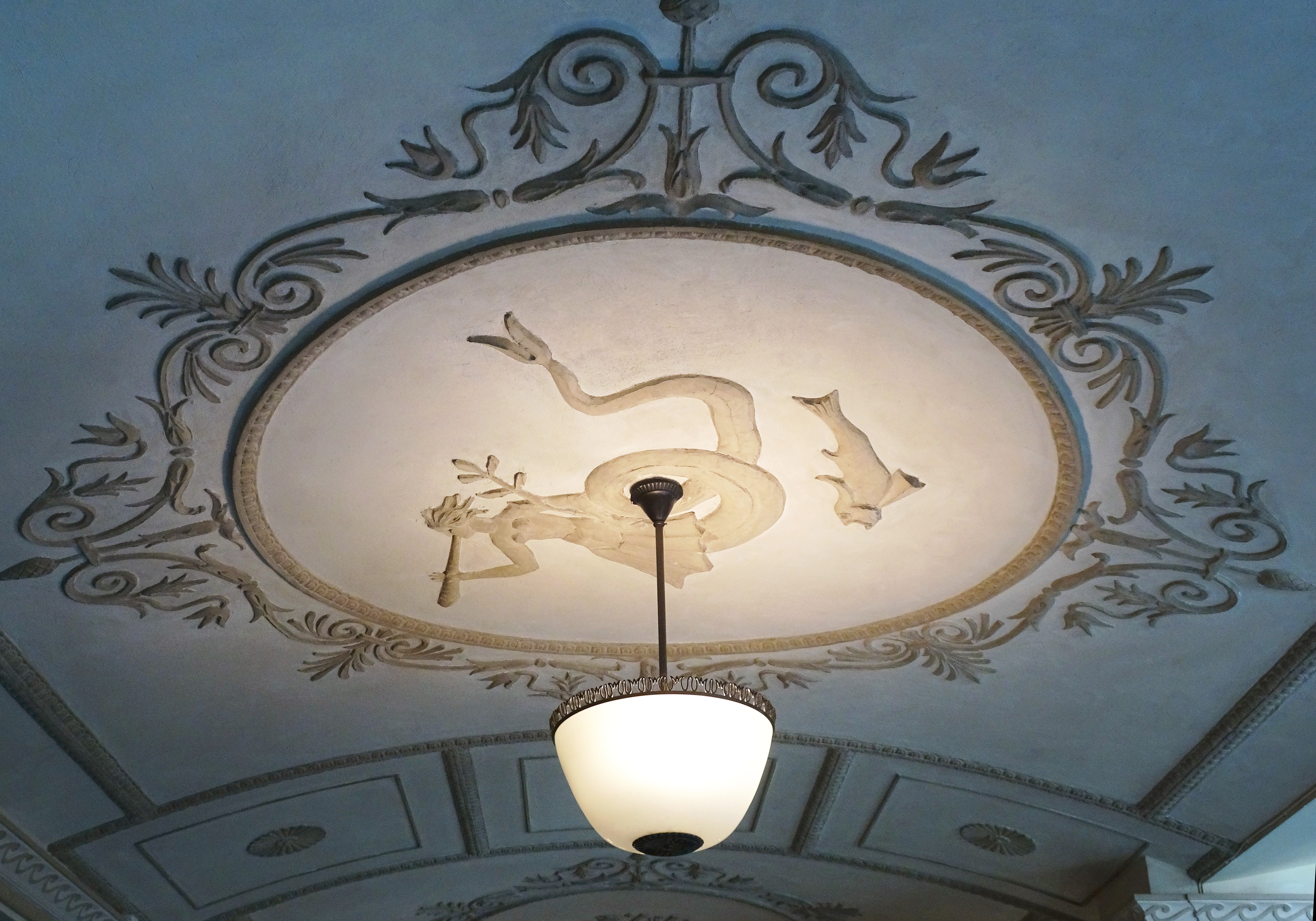
Lamp in the foyer of Stockholm Concert Hall
