= Målerås =

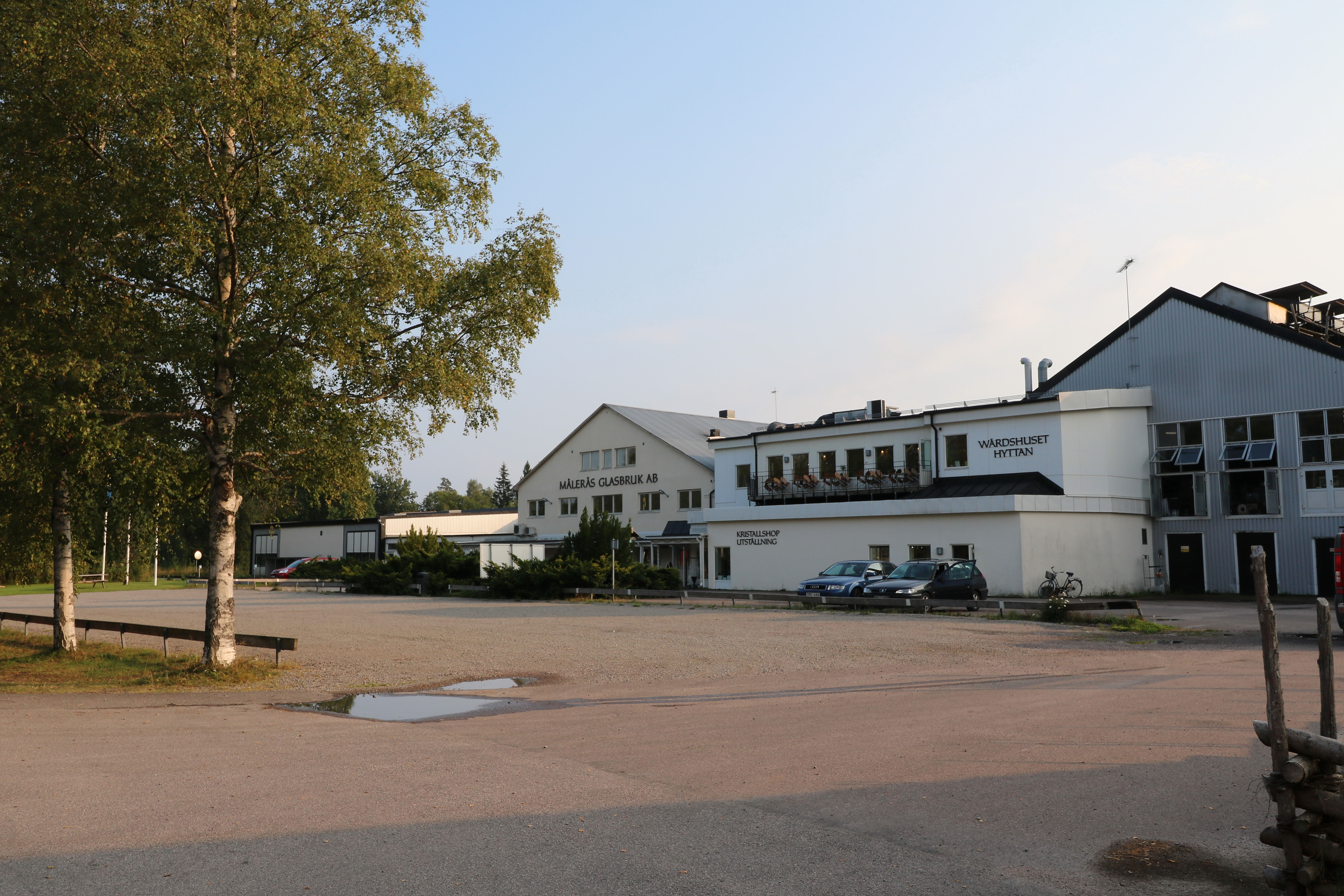

- Location within Kalmar Location within Sweden
- Coordinates: 56°55′N 15°34′E
- Country: Sweden
- Province: Småland
- County: Kalmar County
- Municipality: Nybro Municipality

Area
  - Total: 0.83 km^{2} (0.32 sq mi)

Population (31 December 2010)
  - Total: 211
  - Density: 254/km^{2} (660/sq mi)
- Time zone: UTC+1 (CET)
  - Summer (DST): UTC+2 (CEST)

Målerås (Swedish pronunciation: [mɔlɛrˈoːs]) is a locality situated in Nybro Municipality, Kalmar County, Sweden with 211 inhabitants in 2010.
