= Nybro =

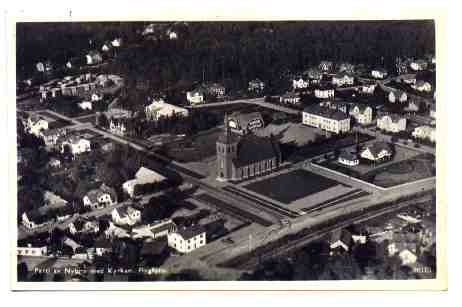
- Nybro airphoto, from an old postcard you see a church, a school and houses.

- Coat of arms

- Location within Kalmar Location within Sweden
- Coordinates: 56°44′N 15°54′E
- Country: Sweden
- Province: Småland
- County: Kalmar County
- Municipality: Nybro Municipality

Area
  - Total: 10.93 km^{2} (4.22 sq mi)

Population (31 December 2020)
  - Total: 13,583
  - Density: 1,247/km^{2} (3,230/sq mi)
- Time zone: UTC+1 (CET)
  - Summer (DST): UTC+2 (N CEST)

Nybro (Swedish: [ˈnŷːbruː], outdatedly [nʏˈbruː]) is a city and the seat of Nybro Municipality, Kalmar County, Sweden with 13,583 inhabitants in 2020.

== Overview ==
Nybro was founded as a rest area for travellers on the road between Växjö in the west and Kalmar in the east. In the 18th century a new bridge was built where the road crossed a stream and it was hence called Nybron, The New Bridge. A small tavern called Lortkrogen (literally the Filth Tavern) opened there. The market town was founded in the 19th century, but it rapidly transformed into an industrial town. In 1865 the town became a municipality separately from Madesjö. It was granted city rights in 1932.

Nybro is surrounded by forests and small agricultural enclaves. Kährs is a manufacturer of wooden floors and the largest employer in the city. But the two glassworks factories (Nybro and Pukeberg) are more known, because they also serve as tourist attraction. Nybro calls itself "The city within the Kingdom of Crystal", the latter being a region with 15 active glassworks including Kosta Boda and Orrefors.

Nybro is also the home of Nybro Vikings IF, a professional ice hockey team currently in the second highest league of Sweden, Hockeyallsvenskan. The club went up from Hockeyettan to Hockeyallsvenskan season 22/23, and had two years in the highest league back in the 60's. The ice hockey stadium in Nybro is the fourth oldest in the whole of Sweden.

The coat of arms was created when city rights were given to Nybro in 1932. The background is golden and the coat of arms depicts a red bridge in the lower part and a pair of black crossbows in the upper. The coat of arms of the neighbouring locality Emmaboda also depicts crossbows. The symbol can be traced back to coats of arms of the province of Småland and the hundred of Södra Möre but its origin is unknown. The local folk-hero and insurgent Nils Dacke is however sometimes depicted with the weapon.
