= Orrefors Glassworks =

Swedish glassmaking company

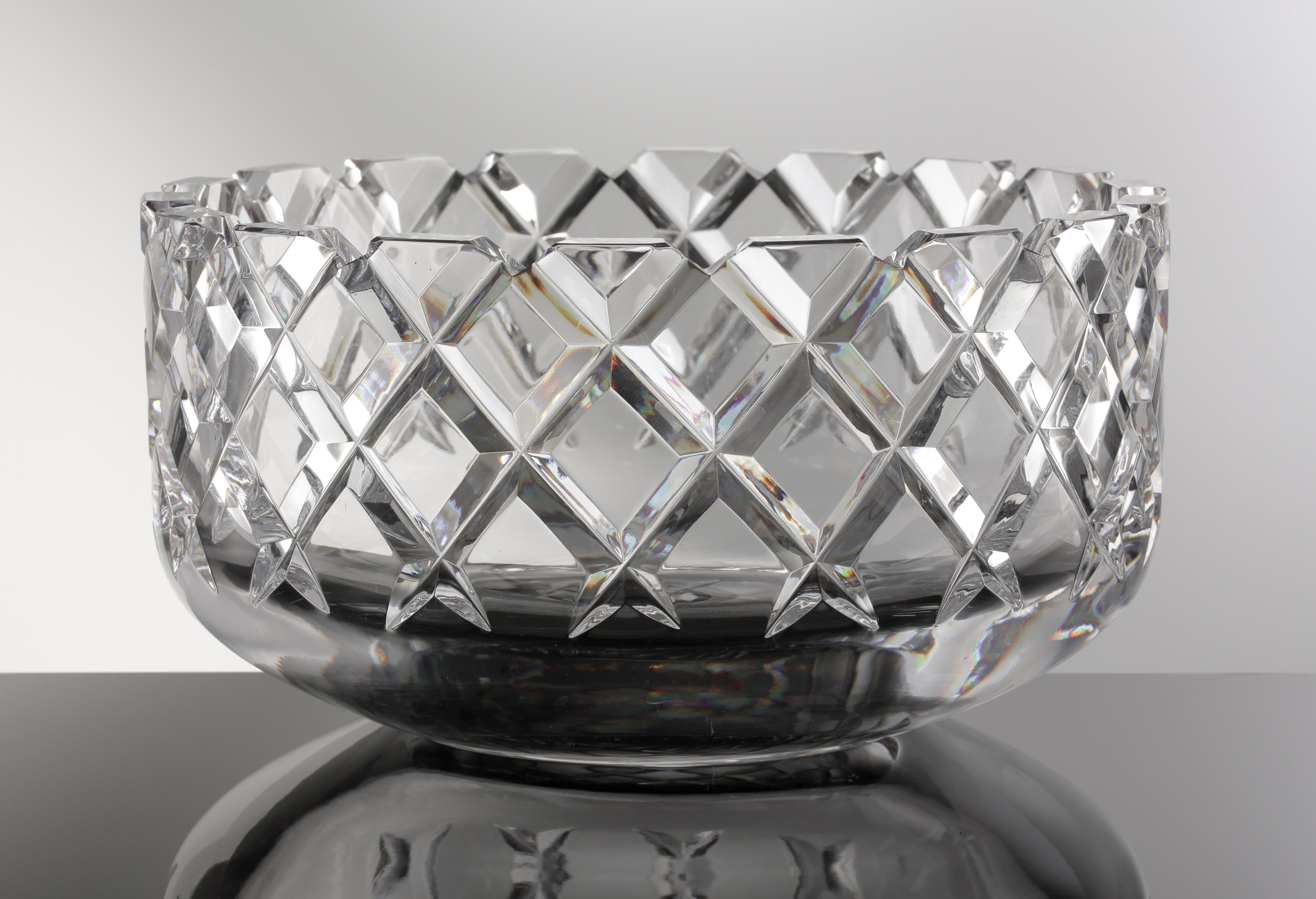
Sofiero cut crystal glass bowl designed by Gunnar Cyrén,1960

Orrefors Glassworks (also known as just Orrefors) was a glassworks in the Swedish village of Orrefors in Småland. Orrefors manufactured crystal glassware and art glass. The range consisted of crystal stemware, barware, vases, sculptures and lighting products in crystal.

In 1990 Orrefors bought Kosta Boda. The glassworks in Orrefors closed in 2012.

== History ==
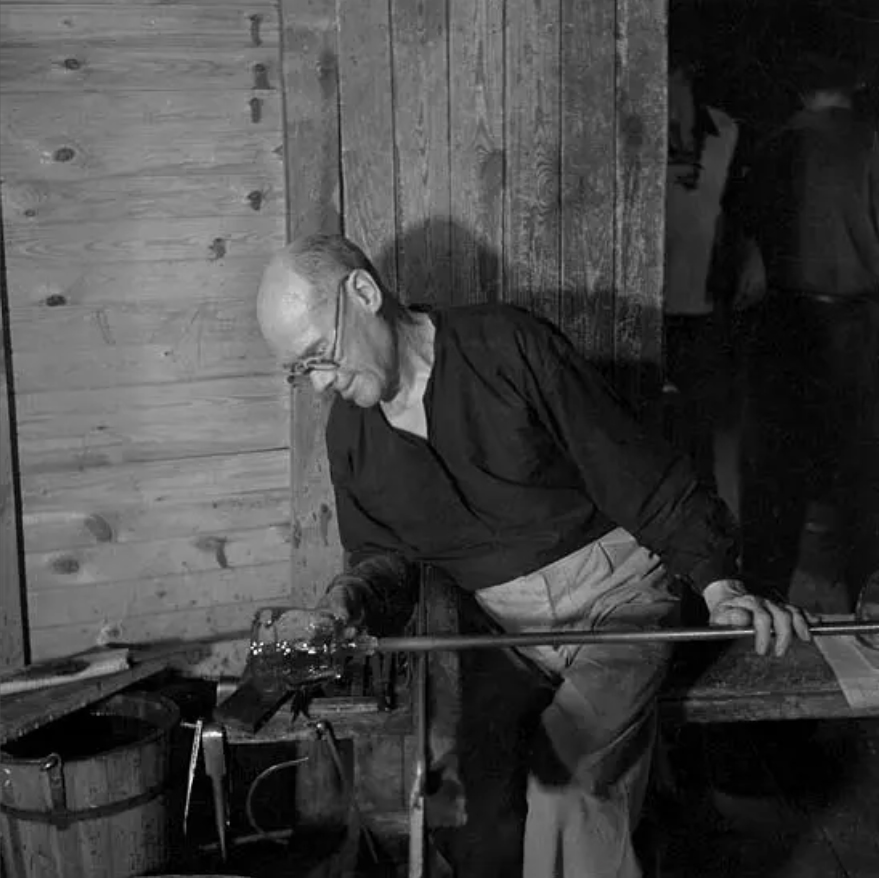
Knut Bergqvist, ca 1940–41

Orrefors glassworks was founded in 1898 on the site of an older iron works. Until 1913, the company produced mainly window glass and bottles. When Consul Johan Ekman bought the factory in 1913, Orrefors started to produce drinking glasses, vases, and other house-ware items. Ekman hired Knut Bergkvist and his nephew Eugen, who had worked at Kosta Glasbruk, as well as Fritz Blomqvist and Heinrich Wollman. Wollman came from Bohemia, which has a long tradition in glassmaking. The first attempts at art glass making were in the style at the time of famous French glassworks including Daum and Gallé.

A similar technique was devised in 1936 which trapped air within the walls of the glass. It is known as Ariel, a name of a character in Shakespeare's play The Tempest. A major influence of theirs was the Art Nouveau work of the French artist Émile Gallé. Their designs use characteristic clean lines of brilliant crystal that suggest a frozen liquid. Their work was greatly admired when it was displayed to a wide audience at the 1925 Paris Exhibition in Paris.

In addition to individual pieces of crystal, the company made crystal stemware. The glass house came to be a leading producer during the interwar period (1918 to 1939). In more recent times the factory has also become noted for making chandeliers. Many of the older designs are still produced in the 21st century. Since 2013, the building has been home to the "Per Ekström Museet", an art museum.

== Gallery ==
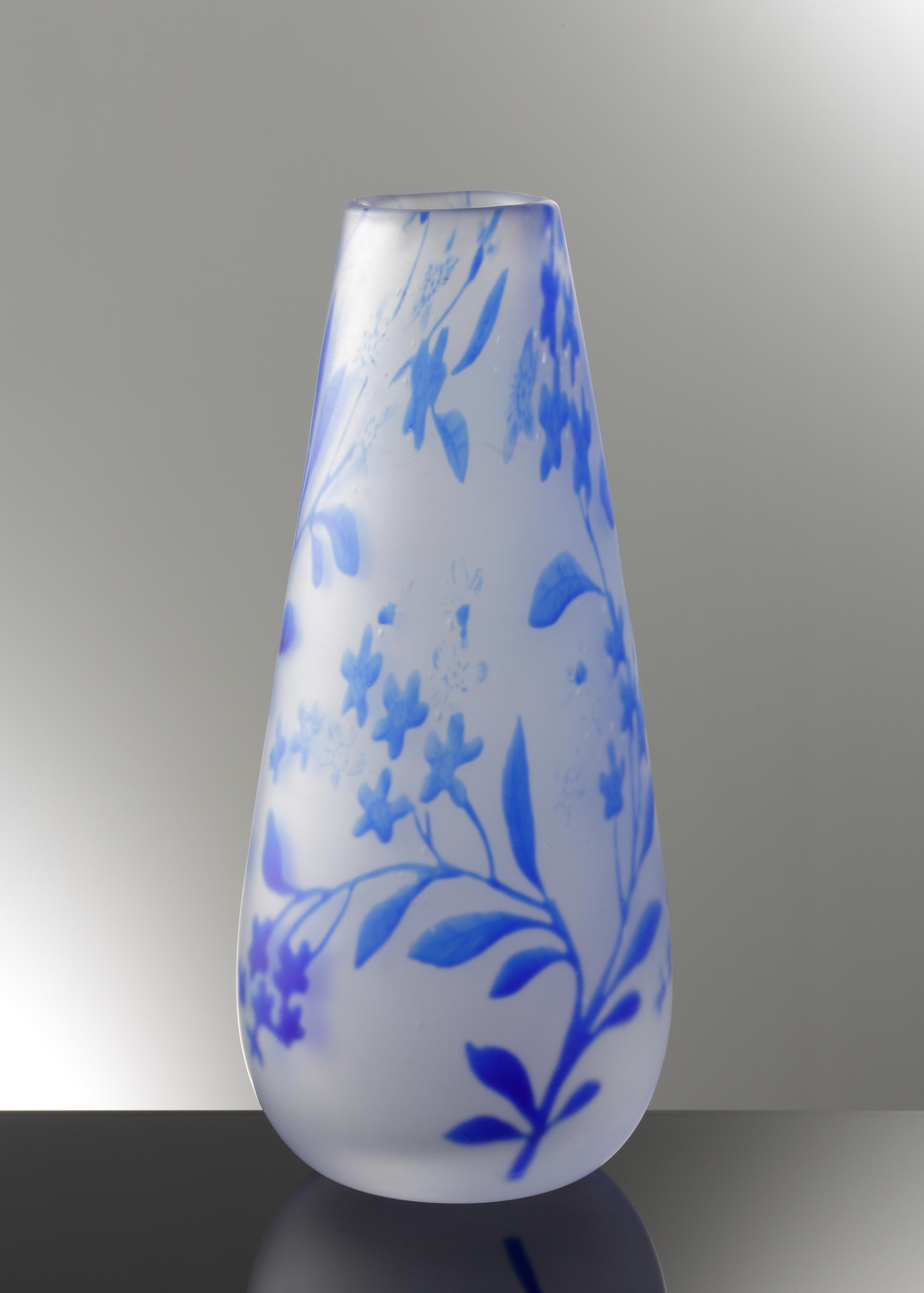
Graal Orrefors KB - HW No 1
vase in Graal technique designed by Simon Gate and made by Knut Bergqvist, 1916

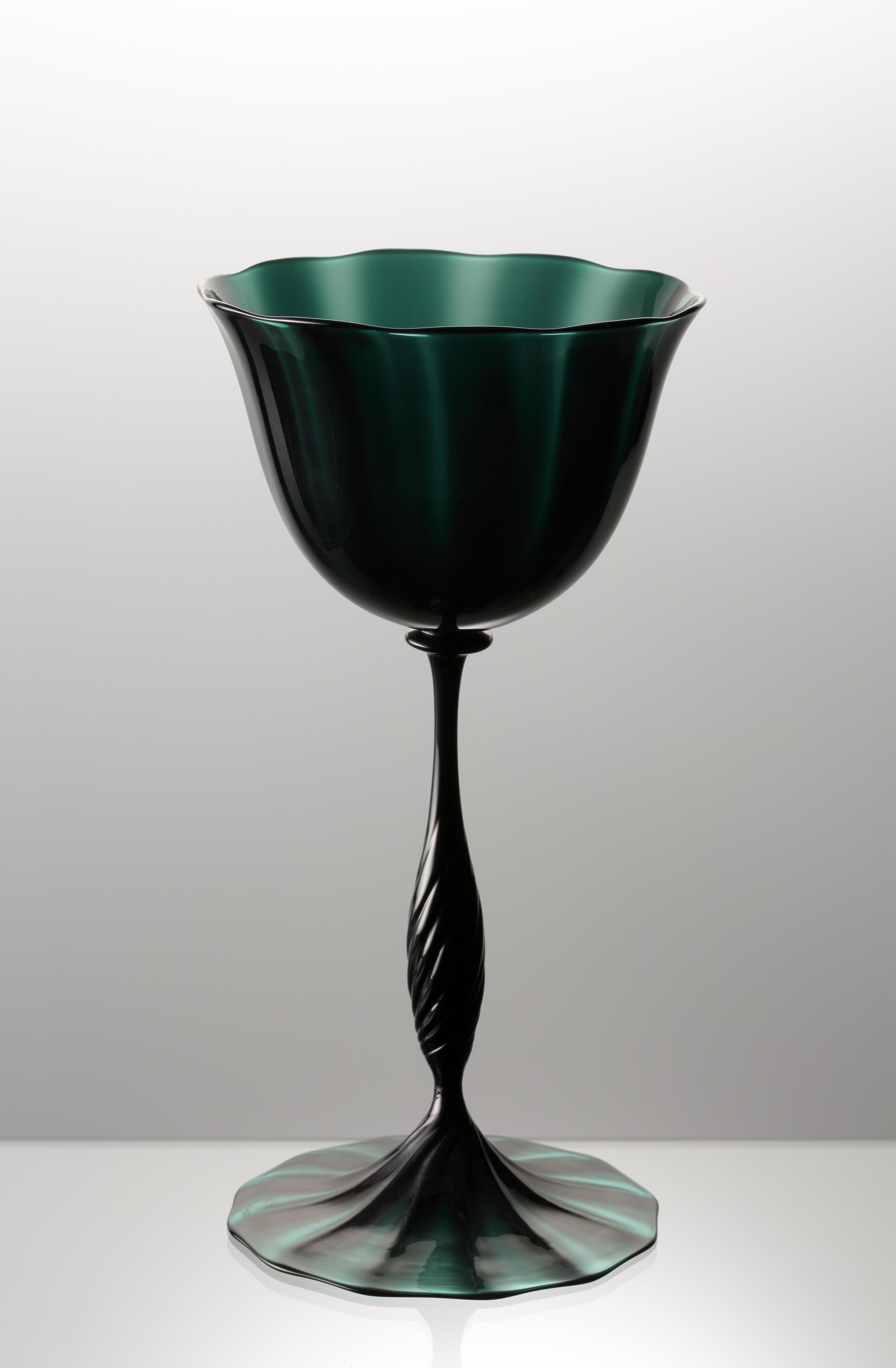
Slotssglas
glass standing cup, designed by Simon Gate and made by Knut Bergqvist for the 1923 Gothenburg Exhibition

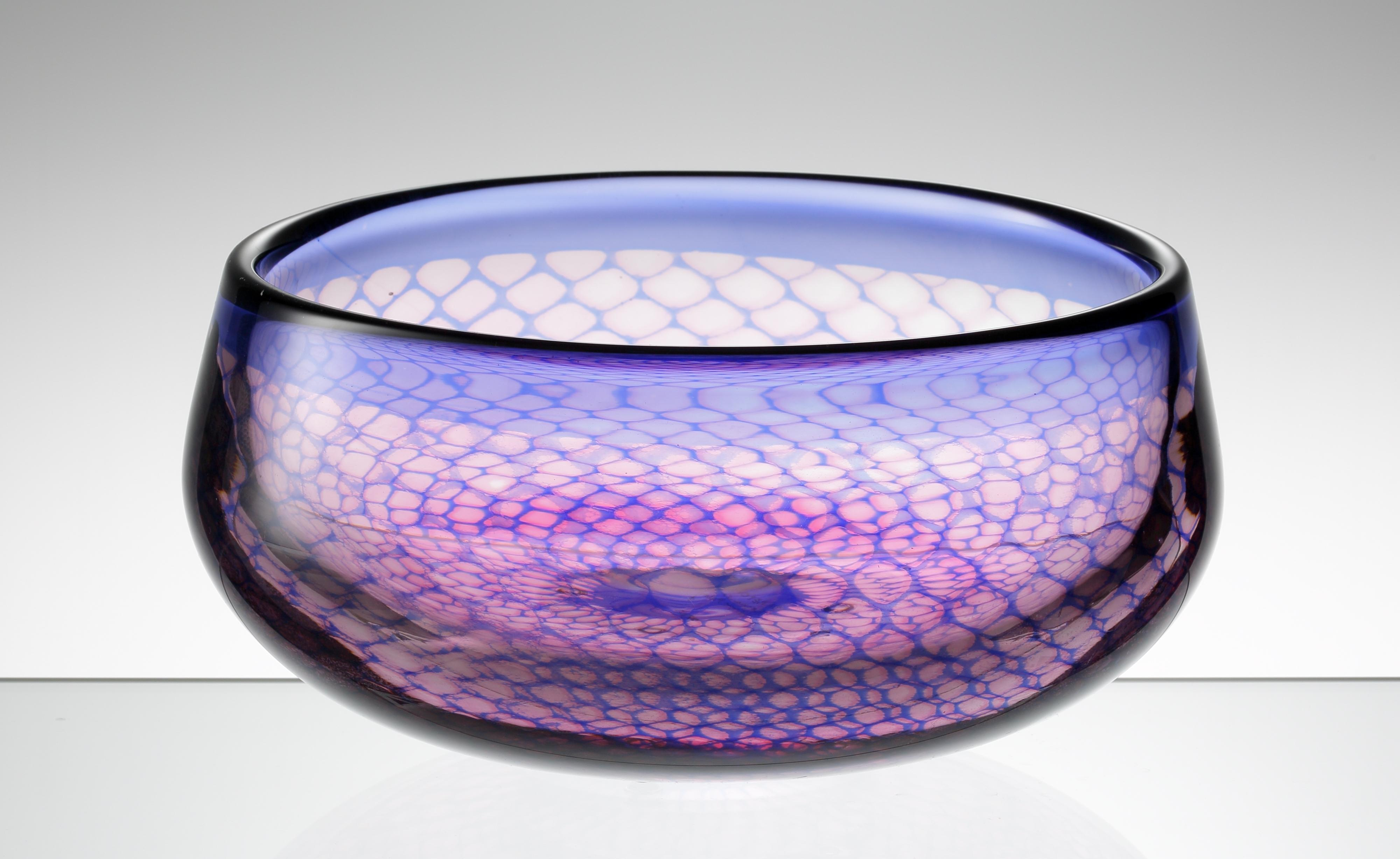
Kraka
glass bowl made in the Kraka technique and designed by Sven Palmqvist, in production from 1941–1959

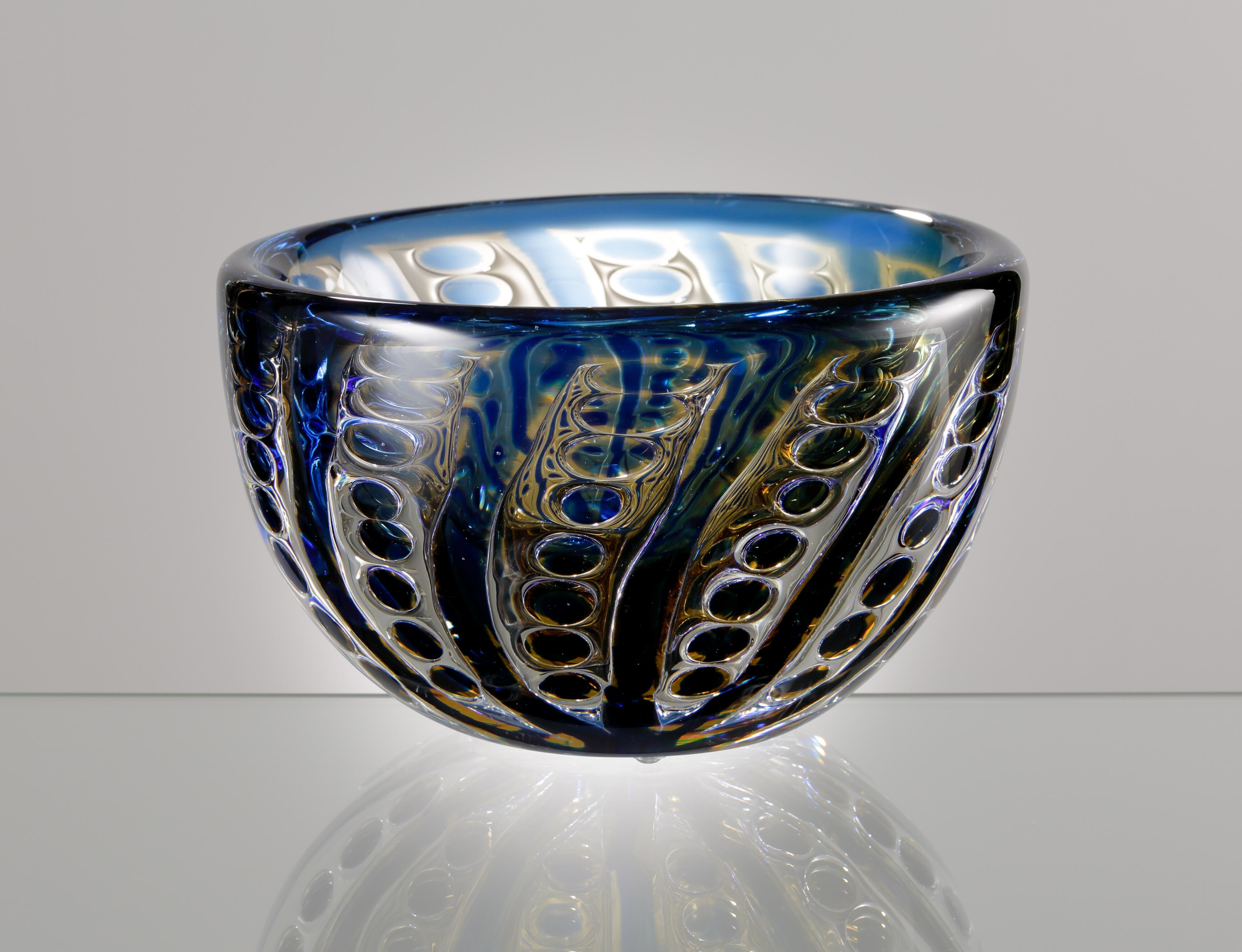
Ariel nr 606 E
glass bowl made with the ariel technique, designed by Edvin Öhrström, 1950

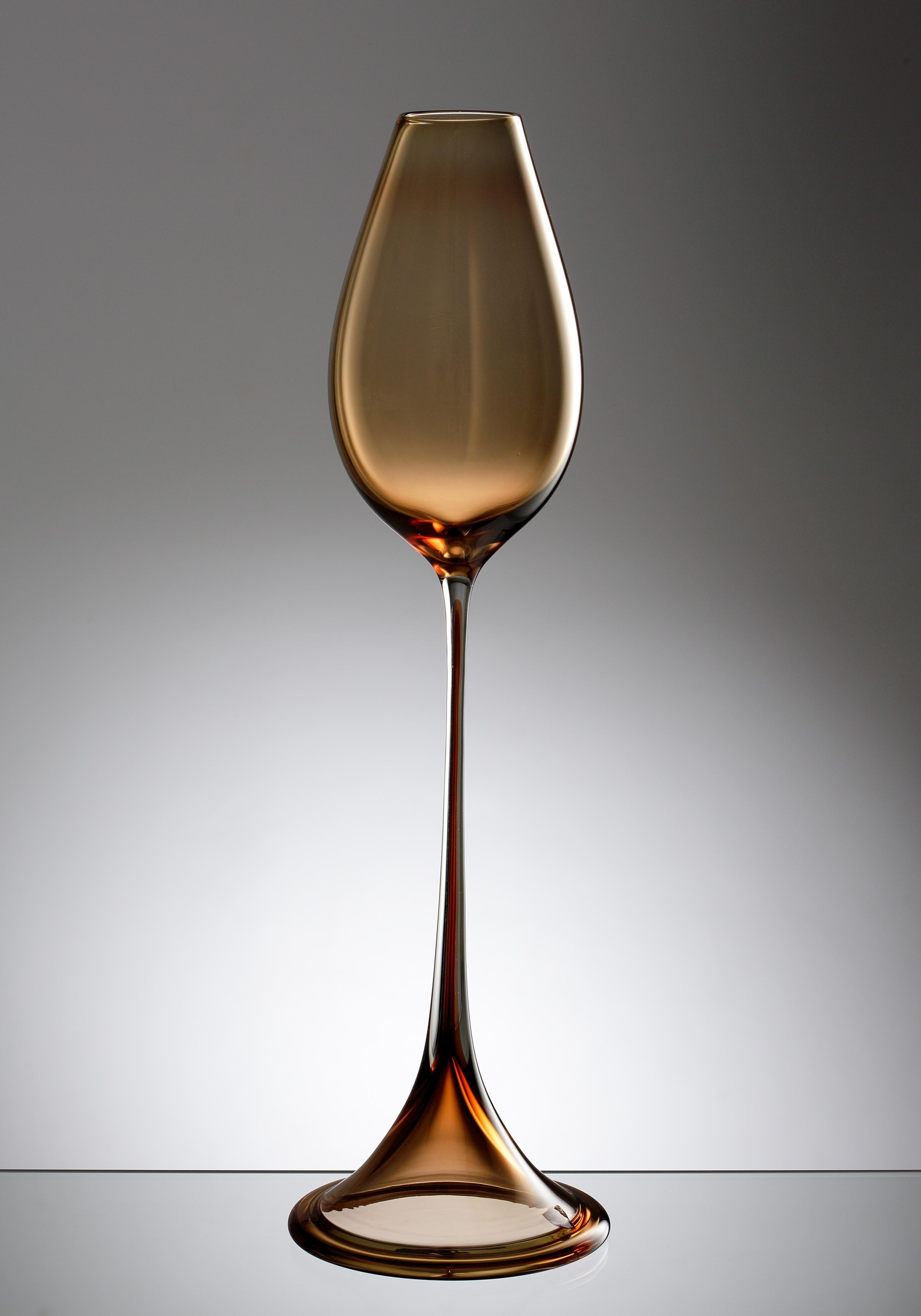
Tulip vase
designed by Nils Landberg, 1957

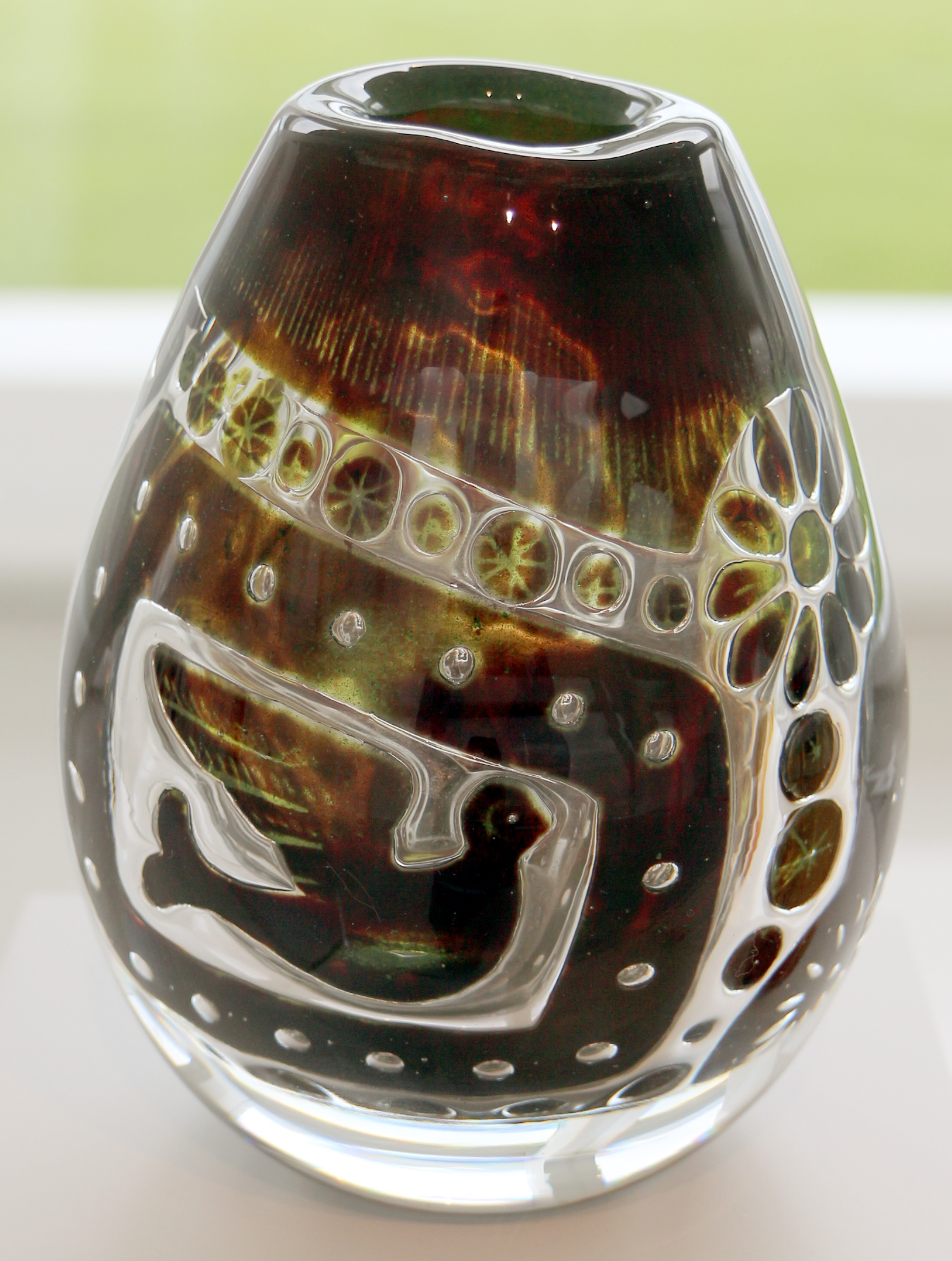
Vase by Edvid Öhrström, 1957

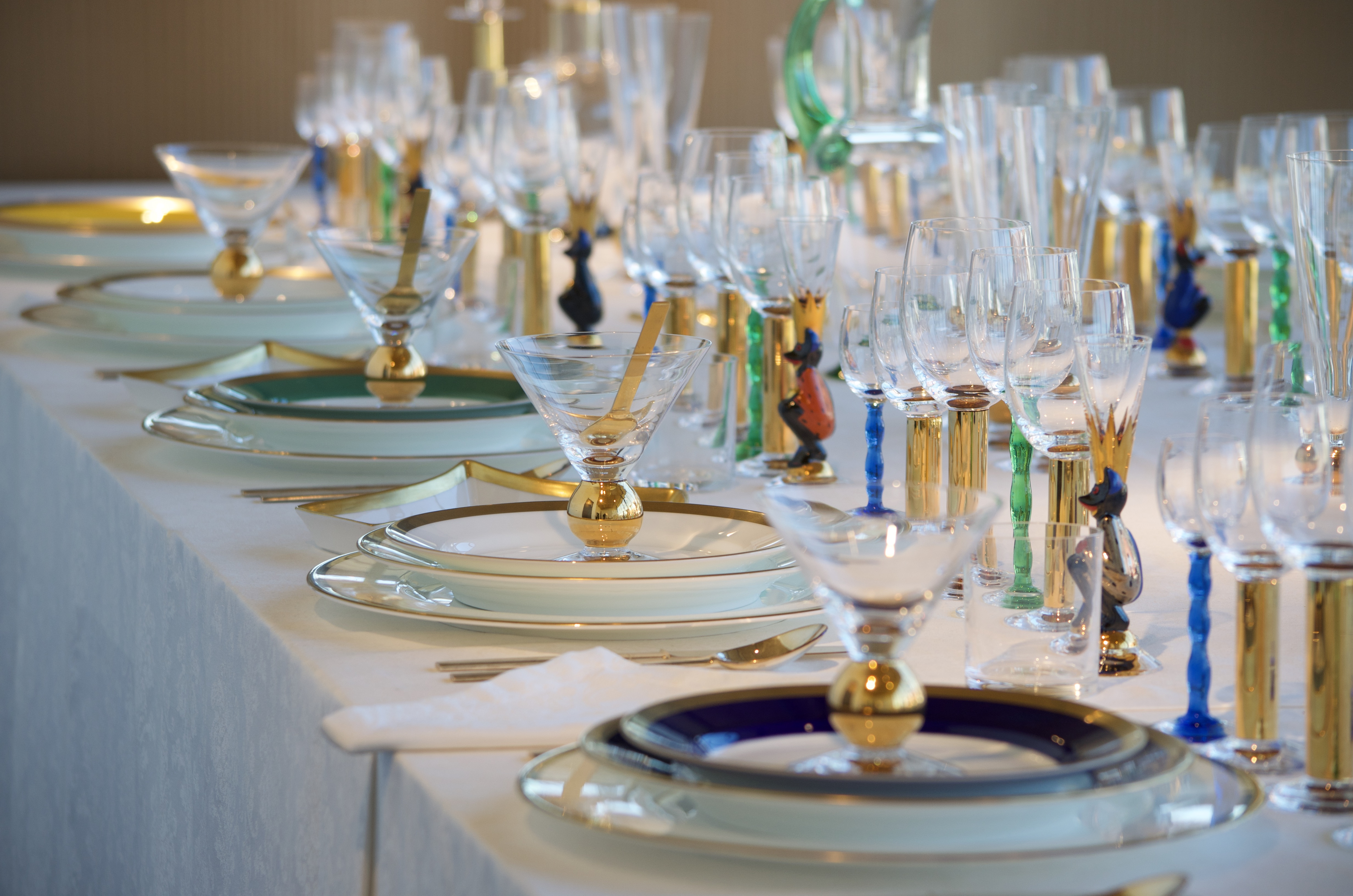
Crystal glasses designed for the Nobel Banquet by Gunnar Cyrén

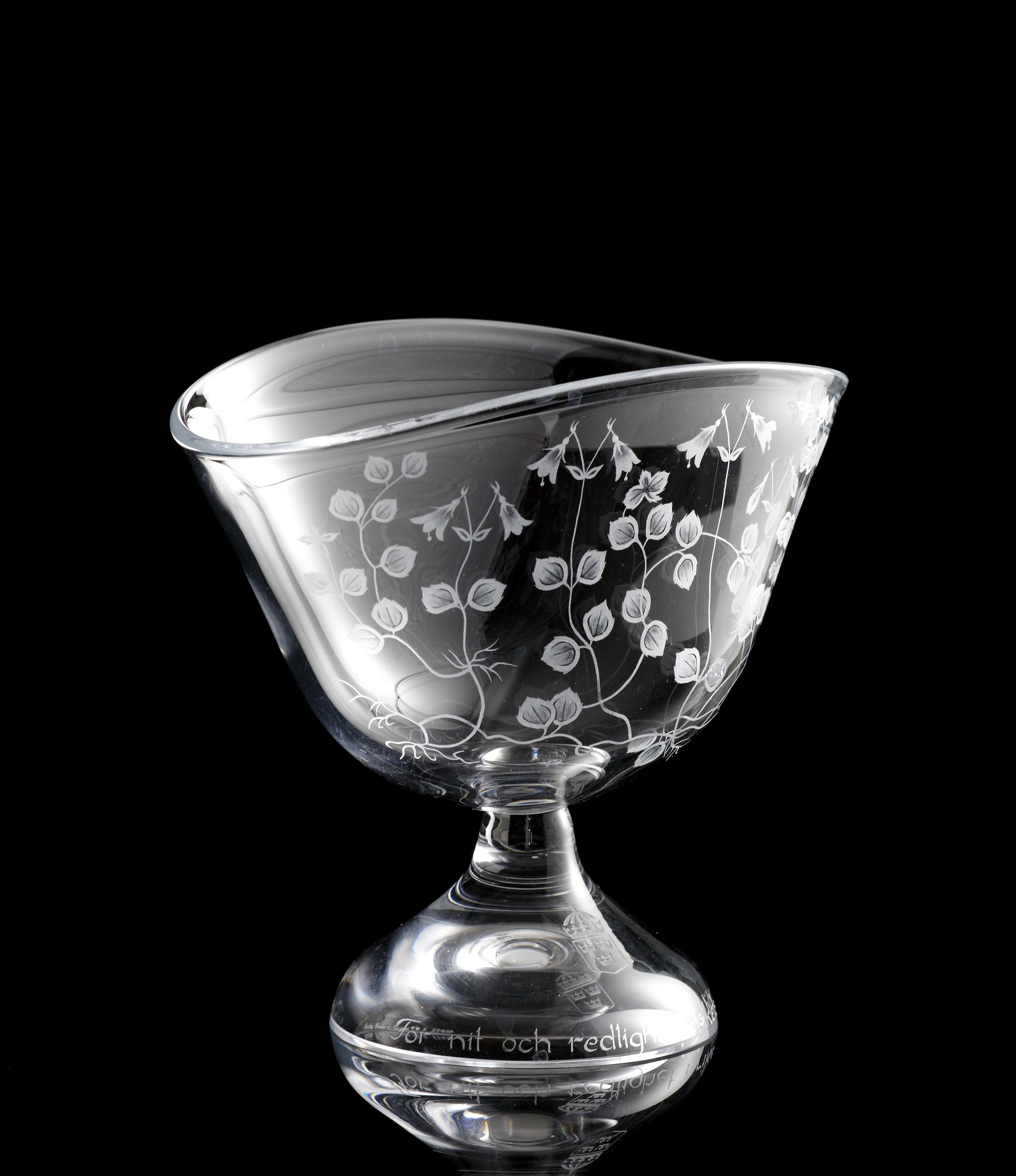
Statstjänstemannaskålen
crystal bowl designed by Lisa Bauer

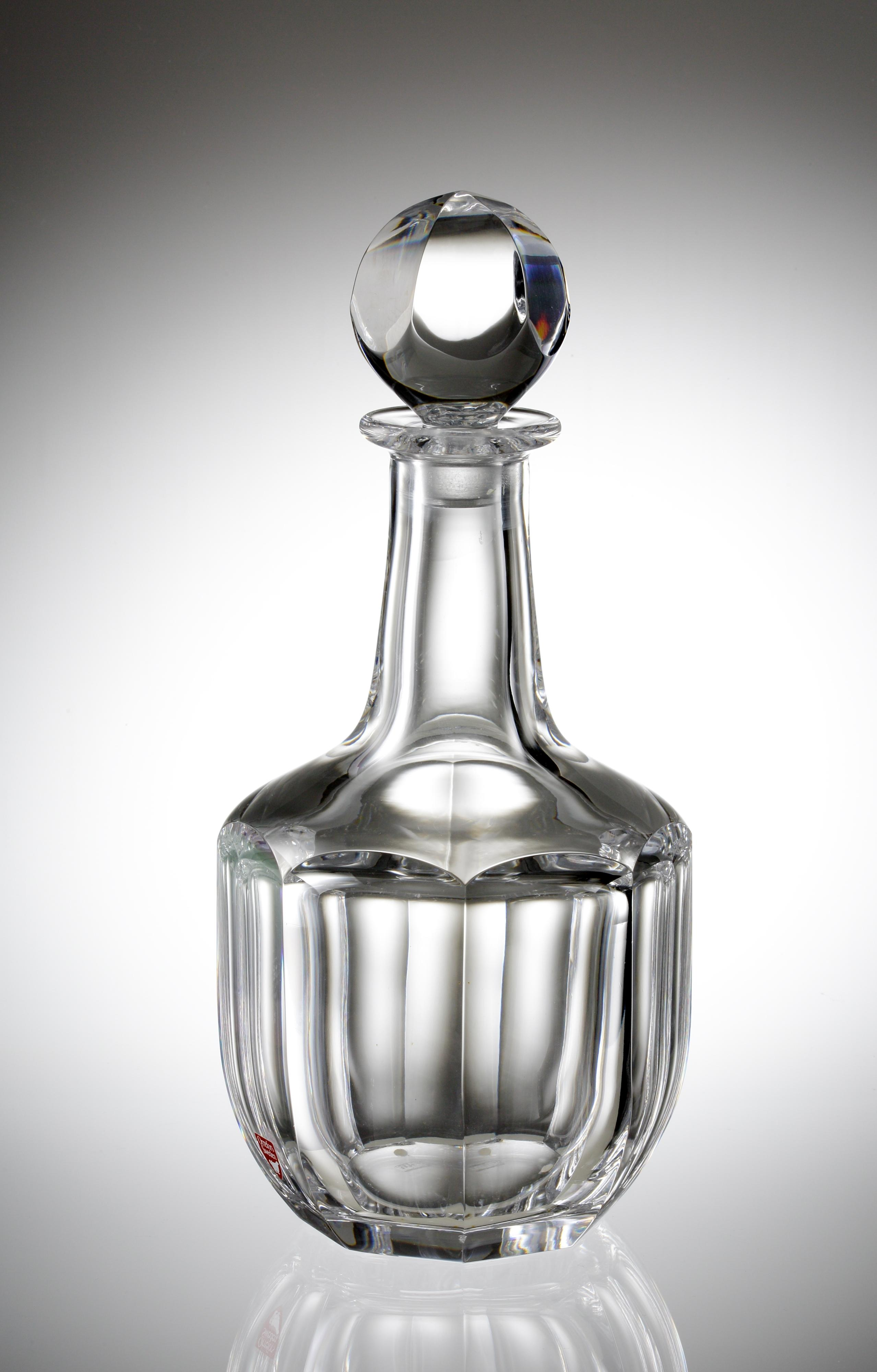
Caraffe by Olle Alberius, 1992

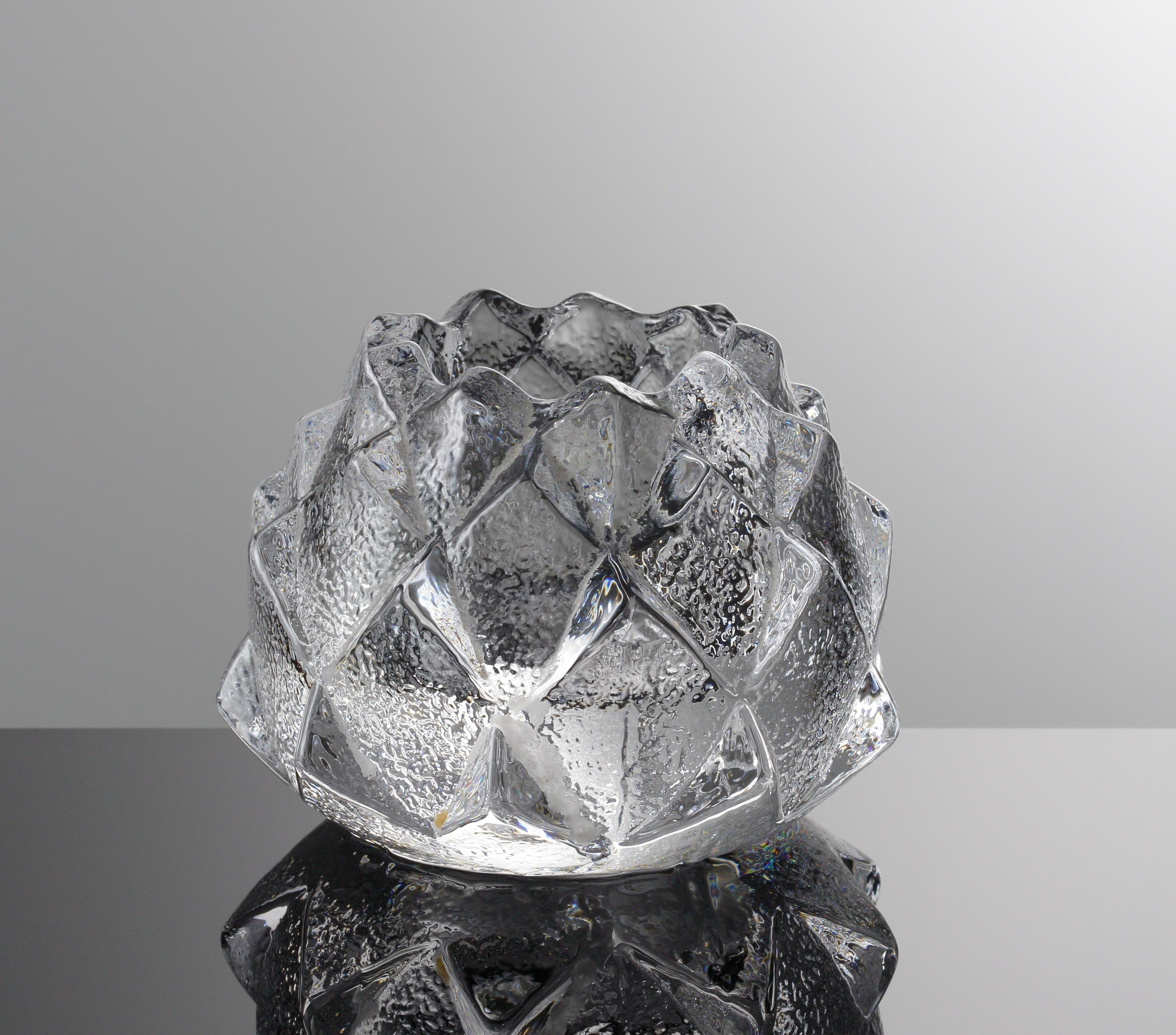
Nimbus candle holder by Berit Johansson, 1981

== Designers at Orrefors ==
- Knut Bergqvist 1914-1929
- Heinrich Wollman 1914-1923
- Gustaf Abels 1915-1959
- Eva Jancke-Björk 1915-1917
- Fritz Blomqvist 1915-1917
- Simon Gate 1916-1945
- Edward Hald 1917-1978
- Nils Landberg 1927-1972
- John Selbing 1927-1973
- Vicke Lindstrand 1928-1940
- Sven Palmqvist 1928-1971
- Mats Eilertsen Bårdlund 1789-1867
- Flory Gate 1904-1998
- Edvin Öhrström 1936-1958
- Fritz Kurz 1940-1946
- Carl Fagerlund 1946-1980
- Ingeborg Lundin 1947-1971
- Gunnar Cyrén 1959-1970, 1976-
- Jan Johansson 1969-
- Börge Lindau 1970-
- Bo Lindekrantz 1970-
- Peter Mandl 1970-
- Styrbjörn Engström 1970
- Olle Alberius 1971-1973
- Henning Koppel 1971-1981
- Rolf Nilsson 1971-1972
- Lars Hellsten 1972-
- Eva Englund 1974-1990
- Wiktor Berndt 1975-1979
- Owe Elven 1975-1978
- Berit Johansson 1979-1983
- Arne Branzell 1980-1982
- Anette Krahner 1980-1981
- Erika Lagerbielke 1982-
- Anne Nilsson 1982-2005
- Klas-Göran Tinbäck 1982-1983
- Matz Borgström 1984-1990
- Helén Krantz 1988-2005
- Vivianne Karlsson 1989-1993
- Lena Bergström 1994-
- Per B Sundberg 1994-
- Martti Rytkönen 1994-
- Ingegerd Råman 1999-
- Karl Lagerfeld 2010-2019
