= Lessebo Municipality =

Lessebo Municipality Lessebo kommun
- Municipality
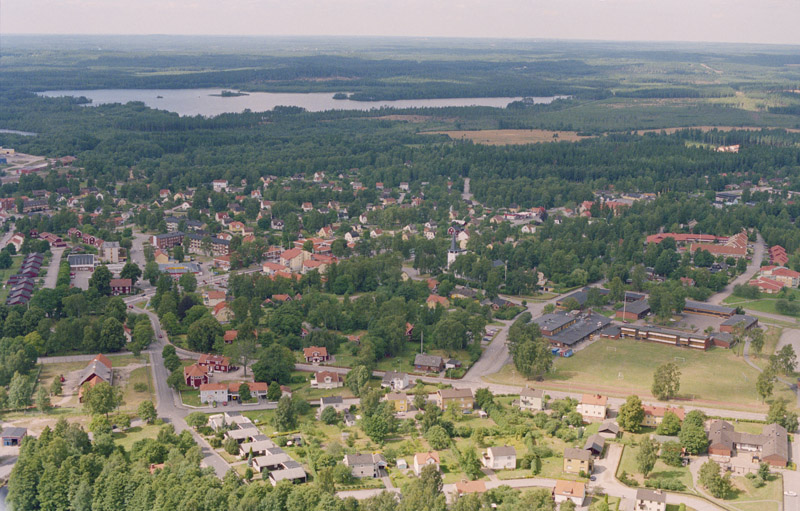

- Coat of arms

- Coordinates: 56°45′N 15°16′E
- Country: Sweden
- County: Kronoberg County
- Seat: Lessebo

Area
  - Total: 456.34 km^{2} (176.19 sq mi)
  - Land: 412.55 km^{2} (159.29 sq mi)
  - Water: 43.79 km^{2} (16.91 sq mi)
- Area as of 1 January 2014.

Population (30 June 2025)
  - Total: 8,260
  - Density: 20.0/km^{2} (51.9/sq mi)
- Time zone: UTC+1 (CET)
  - Summer (DST): UTC+2 (CEST)
- ISO 3166 code: SE
- Province: Småland
- Municipal code: 0761
- Website: www.lessebo.se

Lessebo Municipality (Swedish: Lessebo kommun) is a municipality in eastern Kronoberg County in southern Sweden, where the town Lessebo is seat.

The nationwide local government reform of 1971 saw the creation of the present municipality, when three surrounding municipalities were amalgamated with the market town (köping) of Lessebo (itself instituted in 1939)

In its history, Lessebo Municipality still honours the Swedish emigration in the late 19th century, whereby many poor farmers from Sweden – many of them from Småland – emigrated to the U.S.. When Vilhelm Moberg wrote his acclaimed novels about this time, he located his main characters' home to the parish of Ljuder in eastern Lessebo Municipality. An honorary Walk of the Emigrants also stretches through the municipality and continues to Karlshamn in the south.

== Localities ==
There are 4 urban areas (also called a Tätort or locality) in Lessebo Municipality.

In the table the localities are listed according to the size of the population as of December 31, 2005. The municipal seat is in bold characters.

#	Locality	Population
1	Hovmantorp	3,001
2	**Lessebo**	2,623
3	Kosta	941
4	Skruv	516

== Demographics ==
This is a demographic table based on Lessebo Municipality's electoral districts in the 2022 Swedish general election sourced from SVT's election platform, in turn taken from SCB official statistics.

In total there were 8,559 inhabitants, including 5,962 Swedish citizens of voting age. 50.2% voted for the left coalition and 48.6% for the right coalition. Indicators are in percentage points except population totals and income.

Location	Residents	Citizen adults	Left vote	Right vote	Employed	Swedish parents	Foreign heritage	Income SEK	Degree
Location			%	%					
Ekeberga	1,071	759	58.8	39.5	74	66	34	20,528	26
Hovmantorp V	1,617	1,188	48.8	50.4	83	83	17	26,817	41
Hovmantorp Ö	1,845	1,337	50.1	48.8	78	75	25	23,749	33
Lessebo N	1,624	1,072	56.9	42.3	66	53	47	20,118	23
Lessebo S	1,492	950	41.1	57.3	70	57	43	21,180	26
Ljuder	910	656	41.6	57.3	76	80	20	22,318	26
Source: SVT

== Economy ==
Lessebo Municipality is best known for the manufacture of glassware. It is located in Sweden's so-called Glasriket (Realm of Glass), which also includes the municipalities of Uppvidinge, Emmaboda and Nybro.

The main glassblower company in Lessebo Municipality is Kosta Boda, established in 1742 as "Kosta". They offer instruction for students wanting to learn the field.

Besides the glass industry, Lessebo Municipality also has a manufacturer of handmade paper which was established in 1693, today an exclusive product mainly used for finer documents.
