= Markus Åkesson =

Swedish painter (born 1975)

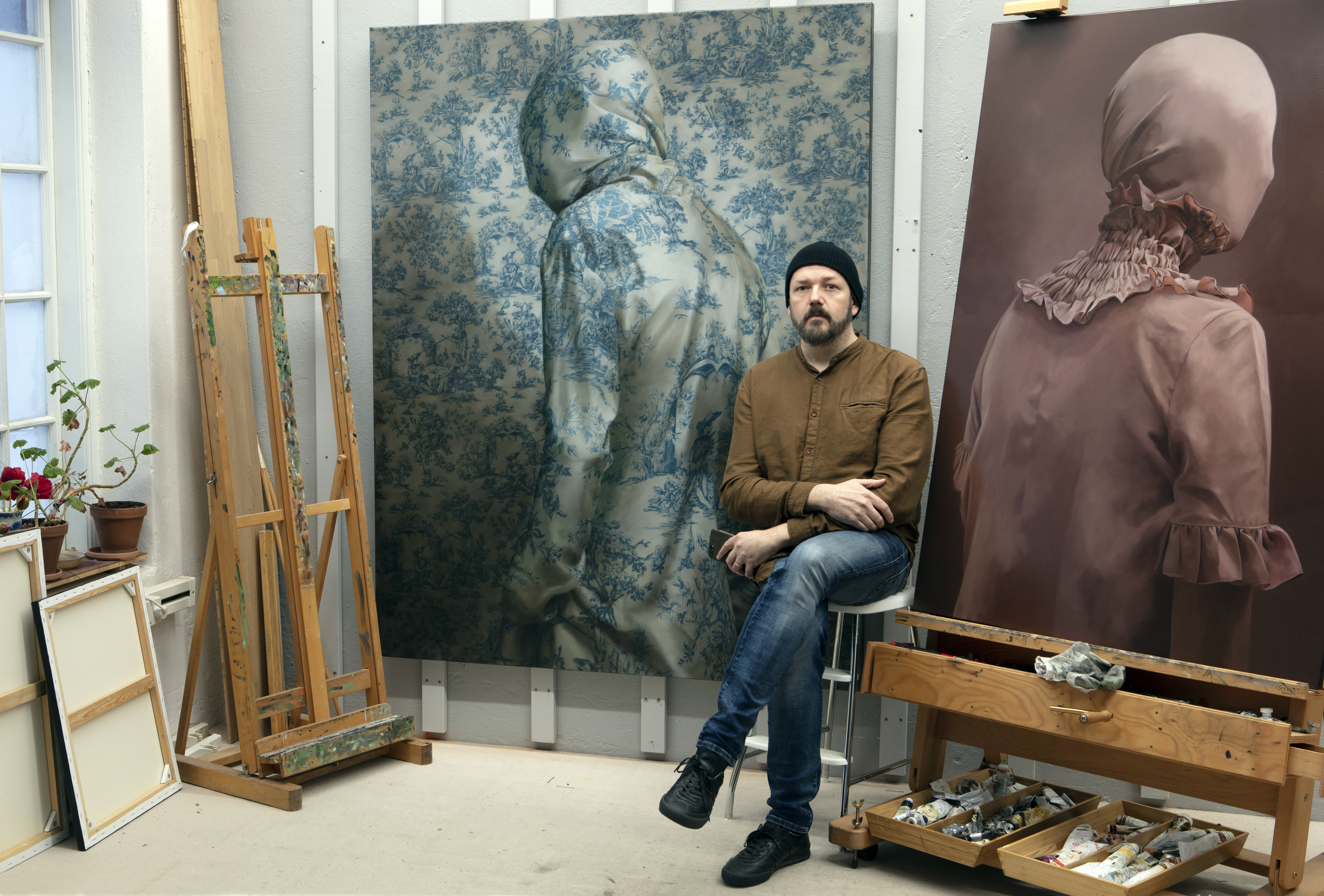
- Born: Dan Markus Åkesson; 10 July 1975 (age 51)
- Known for: Painting, glass sculptures
- Movement: Neo-figurative, Magic Realism
- Website: www.markusakesson.com

Markus Åkesson (born 10 July 1975) is a Swedish artist working with painting and glass sculpture. He lives and works in Nybro, Sweden with his wife, the ceramist Ellen Ehk. His painting studio is in the former glass factory at Pukeberg in Nybro and he collaborates with the glass studio Kosta Boda. He is widely considered as one of the most prominent international painters in the neo-figurative style.

== Early life and education ==
Åkesson was born in the small village of Sporsjö outside of Kalmar in southeastern Sweden surrounded by seemingly boundless forests, making it impossible to grasp the horizon. His father worked as a forester, and his mother, a homemaker. Åkesson was the youngest of four boys and started drawing in his childhood, nurtured by the universes of comic books in which he had a great interest. He thus became passionate about myths and magic, with an especial fondness for the forest. According to him, growing up surrounded by woods, this magical environment has been his primary source of inspiration since a young age and encouraged his imagination greatly. In an interview with Johanna Sandell from the book, Insomnia, Åkesson says "To anyone who knows my history, it’s not difficult to see connections [to my childhood] in my paintings. I grew up in the countryside, in the forest. I played a lot on my own, I was always out in the forest and I drew a lot".

Not coming from an artistic family, Åkesson's creativity manifested itself in the ways that came most naturally in his world. In high school, he studied to be a mechanic and spent his free time airbrushing designs on cars and motorcycles. Growing up in the heart of Sweden's "Crystal Kingdom" it was natural for the artistically inclined to gravitate towards work in the glass industry, and as an adult, he found a job as a crystal engraver in a nearby factory.

Unlike many of his Scandinavian peers, Åkesson has limited formal academic training. He studied briefly at Ölands Folkhögskola, but is otherwise self-taught, taking most of his cues from history, philosophy, and literature. In this period, his culture expands at a great speed, and he discovers the work of other figurative artists like Lucian Freud, Michaël Borremans or Jenny Saville.

== Paintings ==
Åkesson's realistic approach to oil painting contrasted with prevailing artistic trends during the early years of his career. While figurative painting remained a longstanding tradition within Western art, it was less common among younger Scandinavian artists in the 1990s. During this period, he presented several solo exhibitions and completed a number of public art commissions in Sweden.

In 2013, Åkesson began collaborating with the French gallery Da-End. That same year, his painting The Weight (150 × 250 cm), depicting an elephant resting on a carpet, was presented at Art Paris Art Fair at the Grand Palais in Paris. The collaboration subsequently led to further solo and group exhibitions in France and abroad. Åkesson's work has been compared to that of the Pre-Raphaelites, whose paintings he has cited as a source of inspiration. His use of patterned textiles and concealed figures has also been associated with magical realism. Writing about the exhibition Strange Days, French art critic Grégoire Prangé noted affinities with the imagery of René Magritte, emphasizing themes of concealment, identity, and human nature.

A recurring theme in Åkesson's work is body image and self-perception, drawing in part on the concept of dysmorphia, as developed by Joanna Sandell, director of Kalmar Art Museum, Sweden. She states that the series Dysmorphia, depicting bodies entirely covered in fabric, creates a tension between the openly beautiful fabric and the invisible figures. The paintings may then be pointing out that there is more to us as people than mere aesthetics.

=== The in-between ===
Markus Åkesson's works are greatly influenced by myths and fairytales. During his early years of painting, his work revolved around themes such as the passage from childhood to adolescence, with a tinge of mystery and a rather dark atmosphere. As Markus works a lot with series of paintings, his series The Woods, Black Pond and Psychopomp Club, exhibited in his solo show 'The Woods' in 2013 at the Da-End gallery, transcribe his pictorial universe of the time, representing children in an enigmatic space, people half asleep, skulls of animals, psychopomps, settings full of symbols and references to nature. All his paintings seem to have as a common thread the theme of the in-between, a recurring topic in all of his series.

Markus Åkesson declares having long been preoccupied by the theme of the in-between and the transition from one state to another. Symbols in his work include "rites of passages", such as children and adolescents inhabiting his imagery, being between childhood and adulthood, between presence and dreaming, between fiction and reality. By working in a classical way with brushes and oil paint and employing models from the real world such as his children, while using a mysterious setting, he states he wishes to allow the viewer to go on a journey in a place in-between, causing this state of awe where the paintings act as "windows that allow the audience to glance into another world".

=== The patterns ===
Patterns have always been present in Markus Åkesson's pictorial universe. Starting with patterns on rugs and tapestries, he begins to integrate textiles more prominently into his paintings in his solo show "Let me sleep through the night" (2018). He then gradually starts to focus entirely on fabric and its patterns, which eventually becomes the primary subject of his paintings, especially with his series "Now you see me" shown in his solo show Strange Days (2020). The silhouettes usually present in Markus' paintings appear completely hidden, covered with sheets of various patterns and textures.

=== Sleeping Beauty scandal ===
Åkesson was commissioned to do several public works projects, both paintings and sculptures, the most recent of which was commissioned by a grade school in Ängelholm, Sweden. He was asked to create a large painting in the setting of a dark forest. He chose to paint his interpretation of the familiar story, Sleeping Beauty. The primary subject of the painting is a young girl in a bright red dress, surrounded by a group of children who are staring off into the distance. When the work was delivered, employees of the school felt that the painting was too ominous to hang in the cafeteria, its intended place. The painting now hangs in the school library.

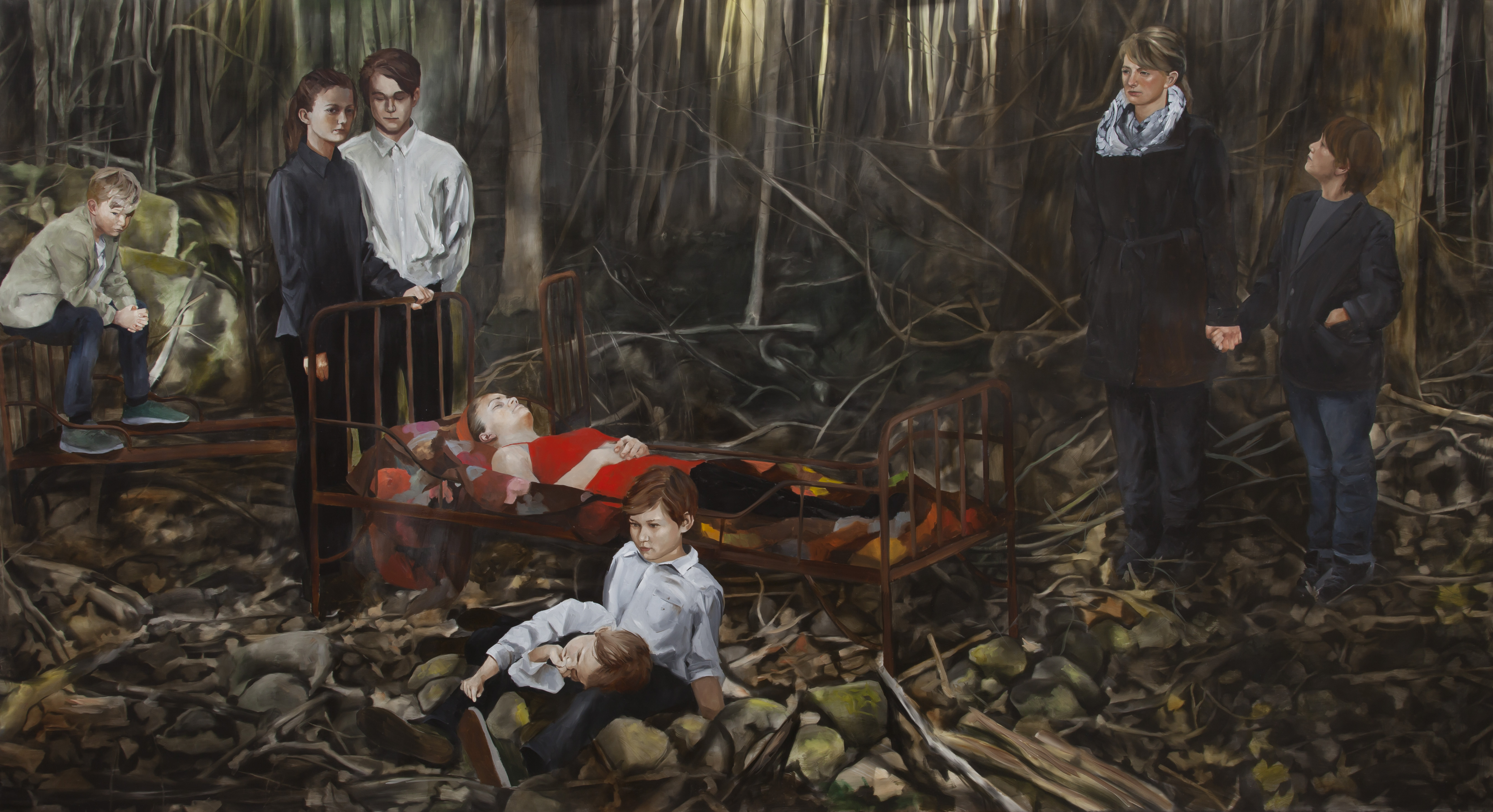
Sleeping Beauty, 2016–17, Markus Åkesson, Oil on Canvas 160x290cm

The incident sparked interest and led to discussions surrounding censorship and challenges regarding modern children.

Åkesson's response to the school's decision was rooted in curiosity. In an interview with The Swedish Television agency, he says, "I find the debate that has surfaced in response to the incident very interesting. It is rather eye-opening to witness the power of art in our society, that it can have such a strong effect on our emotions."

In 2018, Kalmar Konstmuseum curated a retrospective exhibition of Åkesson's work titled Sleeping Beauty, due, in part, to the school's reaction to the painting, stating that the controversy highlighted art's power in society and how much artworks can affect us.

=== Collaboration ===
In 2013, during his solo show "The Woods" at the French gallery Da-End, designer Jun Takahashi discovered the work of Markus Åkesson and stated his desire to collaborate with the painter. The collaboration is materialized by the printing of 3 paintings on shawls for the Fall/Winter 2014 ready-to-wear collection, which was shown in 2014 at the Palais de Tokyo during Paris Fashion Week.

Jun Takahashi reiterated his collaboration with Åkesson for his collection Undercover during the Fall/Winter 2021, in which 4 of Markus Åkesson's paintings were selected (Chesterfield dreams (Edvin), 2011, Childs Play, 2011, Insomnia (Moths), 2017, The Woods (Insomnia), 2013) and printed on outerwear as well as knitwear and shirts for both the men's and women's entire collections.

== Glass sculptures ==
Before becoming a painter, Åkesson was trained as a welder when he was young, and started a job as a glass engraver when he was twenty. While he declared liking the creativity of the glass industry, he then found an urge to express himself through the method of oil painting. Åkesson now has his own atelier in an old Glass Factory called Pukeberg. In 2021 Åkesson returned to the glass industry, this time as an art glass design partner for Kosta Boda. It was through his wife and fellow artist, Ellen Ehk Åkesson that Åkesson came into contact with Kosta Boda. Since spring 2021, the couple has shared a studio in Kosta, in addition to their studios in the old Pukeberg Glassworks in Nybro. Having grown up near one another in the forests of Småland, the mystery of the forest is a strongly shared theme in their art. Ever since his time as a glass engraver, Markus Åkesson has experienced what he calls a powerful pull to glass and has previously experimented with glass sculptures.

Some of his earliest glass pieces were exhibited at the Duo-exhibition 'Skogens Hjärta' at VIDA Museum & Konstall in the spring of 2021. His art glass was also exhibited alongside his paintings at Market Art Fair in Stockholm in the spring of 2022. We find his use of patterns in his sculptures as well, which he spends the most time engraving.

In 2022, along with Kosta Boda, Åkesson created a glass sculpture "Medusa" that shows the supple side of the glass. This sculpture was exhibited in the exhibition "Μέδουσα | Scyphozoa" at Da-End Gallery in Paris.

== Awards ==
- Nybro's Municipality Culture Grant, 2008
- Regional Council in Kalmar, working grant, 2009
- The Swedish Arts Grant Committee, one-year working grant, 2014
- Golden Feather, Barometern, Golden Media, 2014
- The Swedish Arts Grant Committee, two-year working grant, 2018 and 2019
- The Swedish Arts Grant Committee, one-year working grant, 2023
- Beautiful Bizarre Art Price, winner of RAYMAR Traditional art award, 2023

== Collections ==
- Fondation Francès, FR
- Jacques-Antoine Granjon Collection, FR
- The National Museum of Glass, SE
- The National Public Art Council, SE
- Panevėžys, Lithuania
- Nybro Municipality, SE
- Emmaboda Municipality, SE
- Kalmar Municipality, SE
- Linköping Municipality, SE
- Walton Family Foundation, US
- The Lord James Palumbo Collection, UK
- The Alice L. Walton Foundation, US

== Exhibitions ==
2013

- The Woods, Da-End Gallery, Paris
- Art Paris Art Fair, with Da-End Gallery, Grand Palais, Paris
- Cabinet Da-End 03, group exhibition, Da-End Gallery, Paris

2014

- Cabinet Da-End 04, group exhibition, Da-End Gallery, Paris

2015

- Rough Dreams, VIDA Museum, Sweden
- Dedications and Declarations, group exhibition, Cognacq-Jay Museum, Paris
- Under Realism, group exhibition, Da-End Gallery, Paris
- Cabinet Da-End 05, group exhibition, Da-End Gallery, Paris

2016

- ABOVE THE LINE/BELOW THE LINE, Francès Fondation, Clichy-La-Garonne, France
- YIA Art Fair, with Da-End Gallery, Brussels, Belgium
- The milk of human kindness, duo show with Lucy Glendinning, Da-End Gallery, Paris
- Cabinet Da-End 06, group exhibition, Da-End Gallery, Paris
- 16th International Vilnius Painting Triennial, Vilnius, Lithuania
- "Vinterutställning" (Winter exhibition), VIDA Museum, Sweden

2017

- Cabinet Da-End 07, group exhibition, Da-End Gallery, Paris

2018

- Let me sleep through the night, Da-End Gallery, Paris
- Sleeping Beauty, Kalmar Konstmuseum, Kalmar, Sweden
- Markus Åkesson and art collection, Kalmar Kontmuseum, Kalmar, Sweden
- Insomnia, VIDA Museum, Sweden
- La Fabrique Du Regard, Francès Fondation, Senlis, France
- Cabinet Da-End 08, group exhibition, Da-End Gallery, Paris
- Loup Y Es/Tu?, group exhibition, Maisons-Laffite, France

2019

- Cabinet Da-End 09, group exhibition, Da-End Gallery, Paris

2020

- Strange Days, Da-End Gallery, Paris
- Cabinet X, group exhibition, Da-End Gallery, Paris

2021

- Swedish Design Movement, Institut Suédois, Paris
- Skogens Hjärta, VIDA Museum, Sweden
- Now You See Me, Berg Gallery, Stockholm

2022

- Μέδουσα | Scyphozoa, group exhibition, Da-End Gallery, Paris
- The Roses of Heliogabalus, Da-End Gallery, Paris
- Print & Paint, group exhibition, Kasteel d'Ursel, Belgium
- Cabinet XI, group exhibition, Da-End Gallery, Paris
- Market Art Fair 2022, Liljevlach's art hall, Stockholm
- Le Jardin, Miroir du Monde, Château du Rivau, France
- The Trailing Moss and Mystic Glow, joint exhibition with Ellen Ehk Åkesson, Kosta Gallery, Sweden

2023

- Exhibition at the council building Justus Lipsius: joint exhibition with Ellen Ehk Åkesson, European council, Brussels
- Faces cachées, group exhibition, La Manufacture, Museum of Textile Creation and History, Roubaix, France
- Open air exhibition, group exhibition, Soliden Royal Palace, Öland
- Weaver's grove, the Oracle Bones, Berg Gallery, Stockholm

2024

- Art Brussels, joint exhibition, Berg Gallery and Cecilia Hillström Gallery, Brussels
- The Land of the Lotus Eaters, solo show, Da-End Gallery, Paris
- Samtida Svensk Glaskonst, joint glass exhibition, Palace Garden, Ravinen Kulturhus, Basta

2025

- Mädchen* Sein!? vom Tafelbild zu Social Media, Lentos Kunstmuseum, Austria
- La vie est une plaie dont je ne me défais pas, group exhibition, Fondation Francès, Paris

2026

- Passage, solo exhibition, Berg Gallery, Stockholm
- Art Paris 2026, with Da-End Gallery, Paris
- Art Brussels 2026, with Berg Gallery, Belgium
