= Monica Backström =

Swedish glass artist and designer (1939–2020)

- Born: Monica Astrid Stensdotter; 20 May 1939; Hedvig Eleonora and Oscar Parish
- Died: 2 July 2020 (aged 81); Kalmar domkyrkodistrikt
- Education: Konstfack,
- Occupations: Designer, fashion designer, glass artist, jewelry designer
- Spouse: Adam Backström
- Partner: Erik Höglund
- Children: Erika Höglund
- Mother: Astrid Sampe

Monica Astrid Stensdotter Backström (20 May 1939 – 2 July 2020) was a Swedish artist and designer. She is known primarily for her works in glass.

== Life and work ==
Backström was the daughter of textile designer Astrid Sampe and Sten Hultberg, who worked in advertising and then started a textile business. She studied at the Konstfack and Högre konstindustriella skolan from 1959 to 1964.

In 1965 she won a competition that was arranged for the 100th anniversary of Kosta Glasbruk (a Swedish glassworks now known as Kosta Boda), which led to her employment as a glass designer at the company. She went on to work for Kosta for forty years. In the late 1960s and 1970s, she also designed, clothing, jewellery, furniture, and household objects, made public artworks, and collaborated with artists and designers such as Erik Höglund, Ulrica Hydman Vallien, Bertil Vallien, Ann Wolff, and Göran Wärff.

In Scandinavia, her work has been exhibited at or is held in the Kalmar Art Museum, Nationalmuseum, and the Röhsska Museum amongst other galleries and institutions; elsewhere in Europe, pieces by Backström are in the collection of the Victoria and Albert Museum in London, Museum Boijmans Van Beuningen and the Stedelijk Museum in the Netherlands; as well as in collections in the United States and Japan.

== Personal life ==
She was married to the architect Adam Backström from 1961 to 1965. Their marriage ended in divorce. From 1968 to 1972 she lived with the artist Erik Höglund, with whom she had a daughter, Erika Höglund (born 1971), who is also an artist.
