= Kosta, Sweden =

Kosta
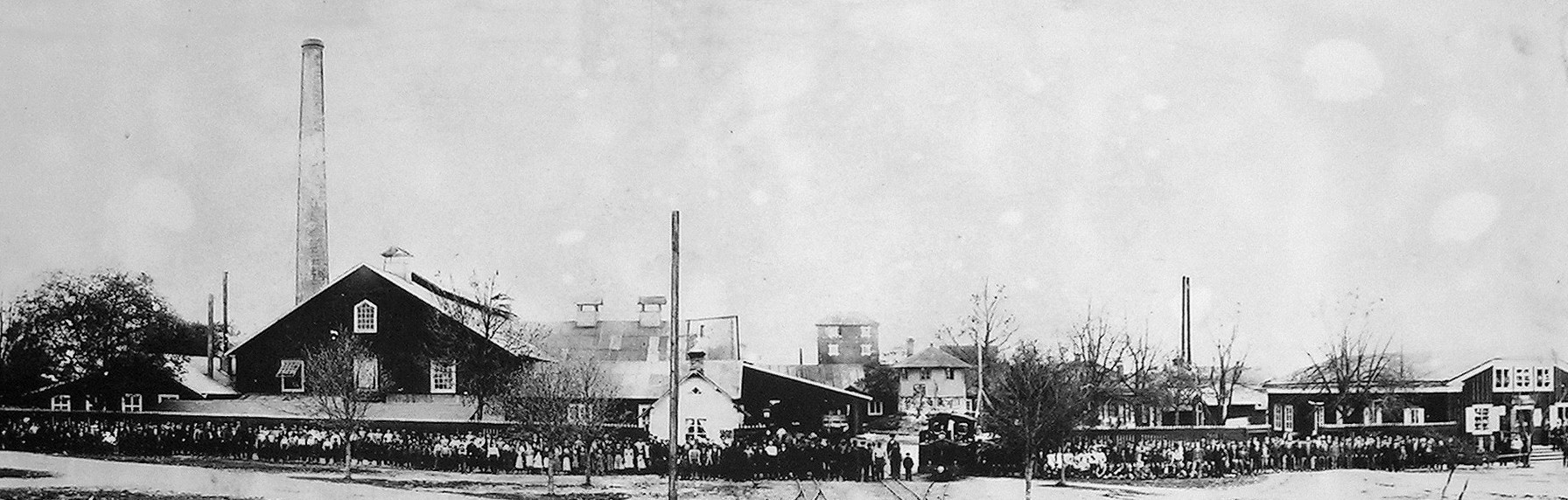
- Kosta glassworks, 1890s

- Location within Kronoberg Location within Sweden
- Coordinates: 56°51′N 15°23′E
- Country: Sweden
- Province: Småland
- County: Kronoberg County
- Municipality: Lessebo Municipality

Area
  - Total: 1.62 km^{2} (0.63 sq mi)

Population (31 December 2010)
  - Total: 884
  - Density: 547/km^{2} (1,420/sq mi)
- Time zone: UTC+1 (CET)
  - Summer (DST): UTC+2 (CEST)

Kosta (Swedish pronunciation: [ˈkûːsta]) is a locality situated in Lessebo Municipality, Kronoberg County, Sweden with 884 inhabitants in 2010.

It is located between the cities of Kalmar and Växjö, in the forested Småland province.

Kosta is known for the glassworks, Kosta Boda.

== Climate ==
Climate data for Kosta Swedish Armed Forces Weather station, 1961-2020
Month	Jan	Feb	Mar	Apr	May	Jun	Jul	Aug	Sep	Oct	Nov	Dec	Year
Mean daily maximum °C (°F)	−1.1 (30.0)	−0.4 (31.3)	4.2 (39.6)	10.0 (50.0)	15.8 (60.4)	19.0 (66.2)	20.0 (68.0)	19.4 (66.9)	14.7 (58.5)	10.2 (50.4)	4.4 (39.9)	1.0 (33.8)	9.8 (49.6)
Daily mean °C (°F)	−3.4 (25.9)	−3.4 (25.9)	−0.4 (31.3)	4.0 (39.2)	9.8 (49.6)	14.0 (57.2)	15.2 (59.4)	14.5 (58.1)	10.6 (51.1)	6.5 (43.7)	1.8 (35.2)	−1.8 (28.8)	5.6 (42.1)
Mean daily minimum °C (°F)	−6.0 (21.2)	−6.4 (20.5)	−5.0 (23.0)	−1.9 (28.6)	3.7 (38.7)	9.0 (48.2)	10.0 (50.0)	9.6 (49.3)	5.5 (41.9)	2.8 (37.0)	−0.6 (30.9)	−4.5 (23.9)	1.3 (34.4)
