= Skruv =

- Location within Kronoberg Location within Sweden
- Coordinates: 56°40′35″N 15°21′57″E
- Country: Sweden
- Province: Småland
- County: Kronoberg County
- Municipality: Lessebo Municipality

Area
  - Total: 1.25 km^{2} (0.48 sq mi)

Population (31 December 2010)
  - Total: 490
  - Density: 393/km^{2} (1,020/sq mi)
- Time zone: UTC+1 (CET)
  - Summer (DST): UTC+2 (CEST)

Skruv is a locality situated in Lessebo Municipality, Kronoberg County, Sweden with 490 inhabitants in 2010.
