= Elis Bergh =

Swedish architect

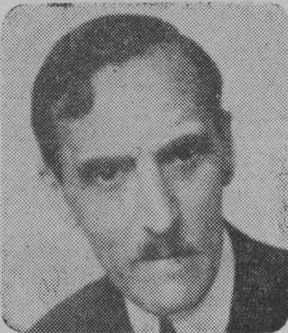
Elis Bergh

Hagbard Elias "Elis" Bergh 17 April 1881 − 23 June 1954) was a Swedish architect and designer. He became better known as a glass artist at Kosta Glasbruk.

== Life and work ==
Bergh was born in Linköping. He studied at the Academy of Arts in Stockholm 1899–1902 and practiced with architect Agi Lindegren 1902–1903, where he participated in the decoration of the Gustaf Vasa Church. But his architectural career was short. Notable among his early works as an architect is Villa Skoga in Storängen, which he designed in 1906 for the book publisher Wilhelm Widstrand of Wahlström & Widstrand.

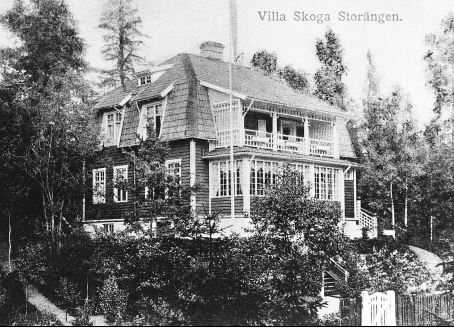
Villa Skoga in Storängen, 1906.

Bergh was employed in Böhlmark's lamp factory 1906–1916, then at Pukeberg's glass factory and factory manager at Herman Bergman's art foundry, he also worked for C. G. Hallberg's Guldsmeds AB. Between 1928 and 1950 he was the artistic director of Kosta Glasbruk. After 1950 and until his death in 1954, he worked as a consultant for Kosta. He came to Kosta through an architectural assignment when he was to carry out an interior design assignment at the mill. In 1928 he was called back, now to design lighting fixtures, a field in which he was considered an authority.

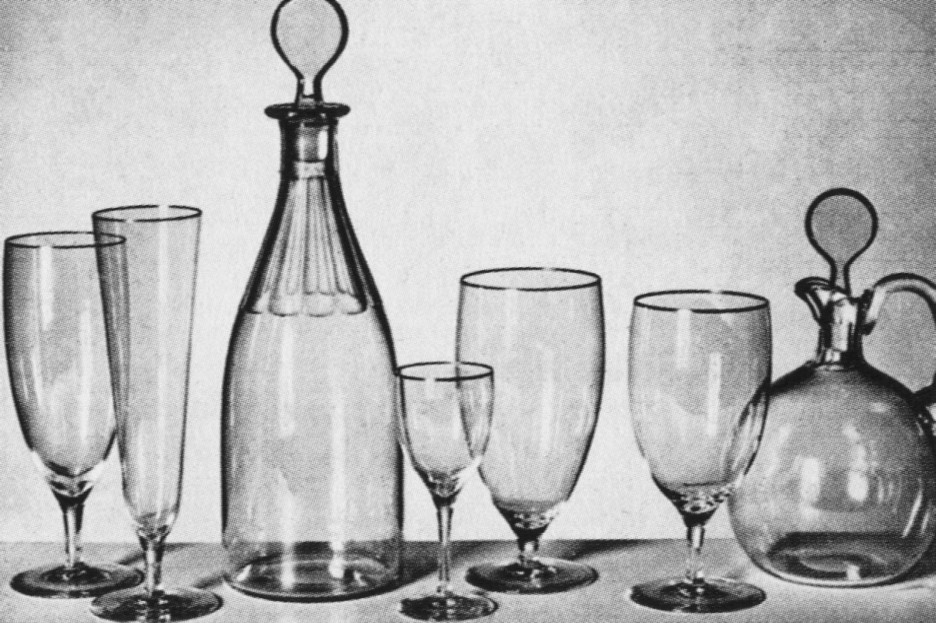
Elis Bergh, glass and decanter for Kosta glassworks, circa 1936.

As artistic director, he was responsible for the graceful yet modern design that distinguished Kosta's output during the Interwar period. Elis Bergh has designed many glass dishes, including "Karlberg" and "Kulla", but also objects such as vases and other decorative objects. He is buried in the Norra begravningsplatsen outside Stockholm.

Bergh died in Kungsholm parish in Stockholm.
