= Astrid Sampe =

Swedish textile designer (1909–2002)

Astrid Sampe HonRDI
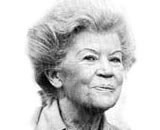
- Astrid Sampe, approximately 1980
- Born: 27 May 1909; Nacka Parish, Stockholm, Sweden
- Died: 1 January 2002 (aged 92); Farsta Church Parish, Stockholm, Sweden
- Other name: Astrid Sampe-Hultberg
- Education: Konstfack, Stockholm; Royal College of Art, London
- Known for: Textile design at Nordiska Kompaniet
- Awards: Gold Medal – Milan Triennale 1954; Gregor Paulsson Trophy 1956; Silver Medal – Milan Triennale 1960

Astrid Sampe (27 May 1909 – 1 January 2002) was a Swedish textile designer who for a large part of her professional life was affiliated with the textile department at Nordiska Kompaniet but also worked for several other textile producers.

== Life Biography ==
Sampe studied at Konstfack in Stockholm and later at the Royal College of Art in London. In 1935, she started working as a designer for Nordiska Kompaniet. In 1937 she became head of Nordiska Kompaniet's textile design department (Textilkammaren) and remained so until 1971. She produced a number of influential designs and also connected many successful designers, architects and artists to Nordiska Kompaniet's textile department. Among these people are Danish designer Arne Jacobsen and Swedish designers Viola Gråsten and Stig Lindberg. When the textile department closed in 1971, Astrid Sampe retired from Nordiska Kompaniet and established her own studio in Stockholm.

She was very successful at the World Fairs in Paris 1937 and in New York 1939. For the exhibition in New York she worked on the design of the Swedish Pavilion together with the architect Sven Markelius.s

Astrid Sampe was an innovative designer who designed modern textiles for industrial production while still preserving and extending the traditions of Nordic textile design. She was the first designer in Sweden to experiment with fibreglass cloth and to use data-based or computer-generated patterns. In 1955 she produced several designs for domestic linens with geometric patterns and folk-inspired motifs that became a huge success. Astrid Sampe designed products for a number of Swedish textile companies such as Kasthall and Almedahls, and her designs include Liljerand, Liljeruta, and Versailles. She also designed for Knoll International in New York and Donald Brothers in Dundee. Some of her textiles are still in production.

In 1948, Astrid Sampe co-wrote the book Textiles Illustrated (in Swedish: Textil bilderbok) with Vera Diurson. In 1949, she was elected an honorary member of the Royal Designers for Industry in London. She was awarded a gold medal at the 1954 Milan Triennale, and a silver medal at the 1960 Triennale. In 1956, she received the Gregor Paulsson Trophy.
