= Kosta Boda =

Swedish glassmaking company and museum

Coordinates: 56°51′12″N 15°23′34″E

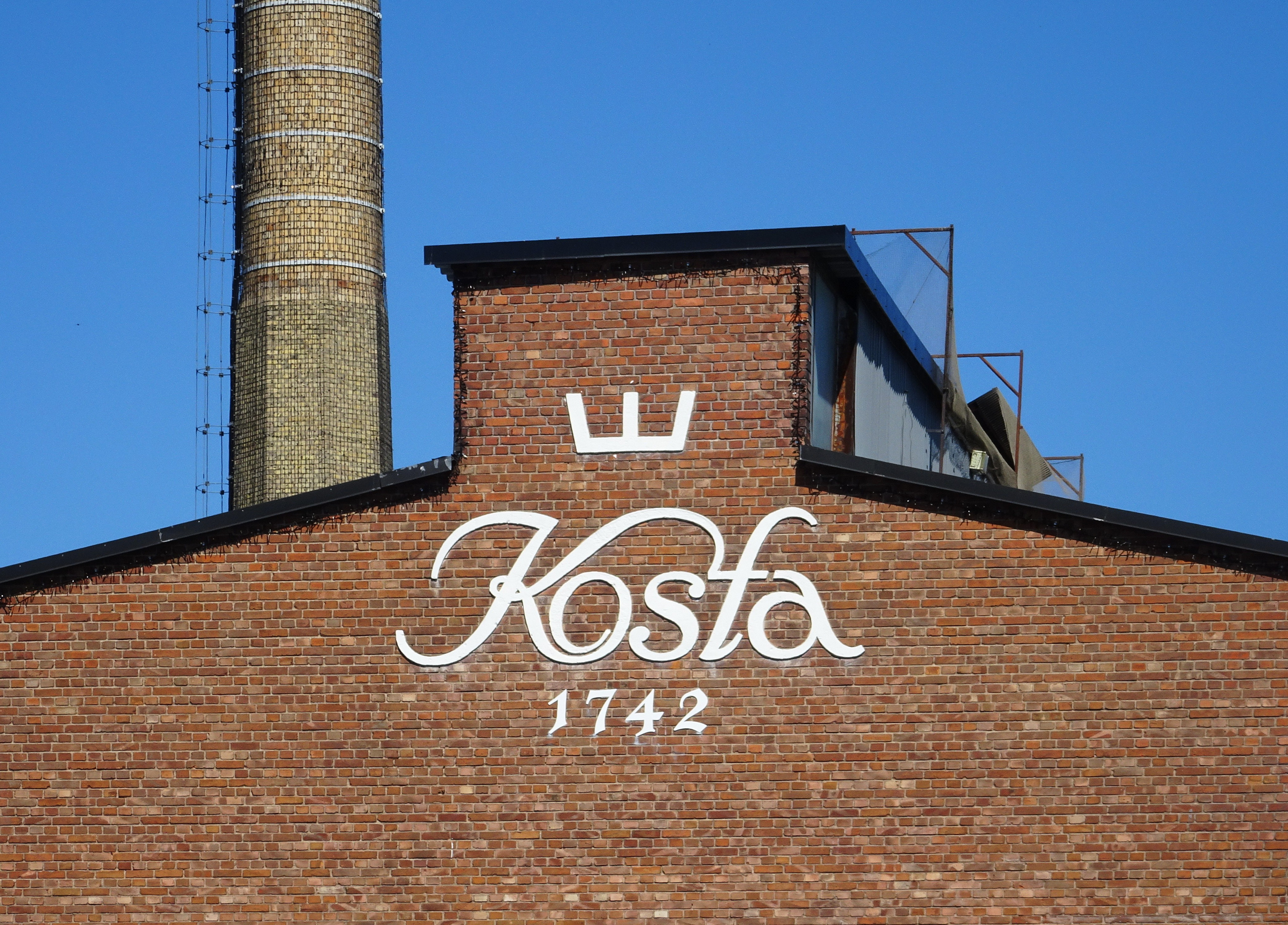
- Detail of Kosta Boda foundry building (2018)
- Type: Private
- Industry: Glassware, Art Glass
- Predecessor: Kosta Glasbruk
- Founded: 1742
- Founder: Anders Koskull; Georg Bogislaus Stael von Holstein
- Headquarters: Kosta, Småland, Sweden
- Area served: Worldwide
- Parent: New Wave Group
- Website: kostaboda.com

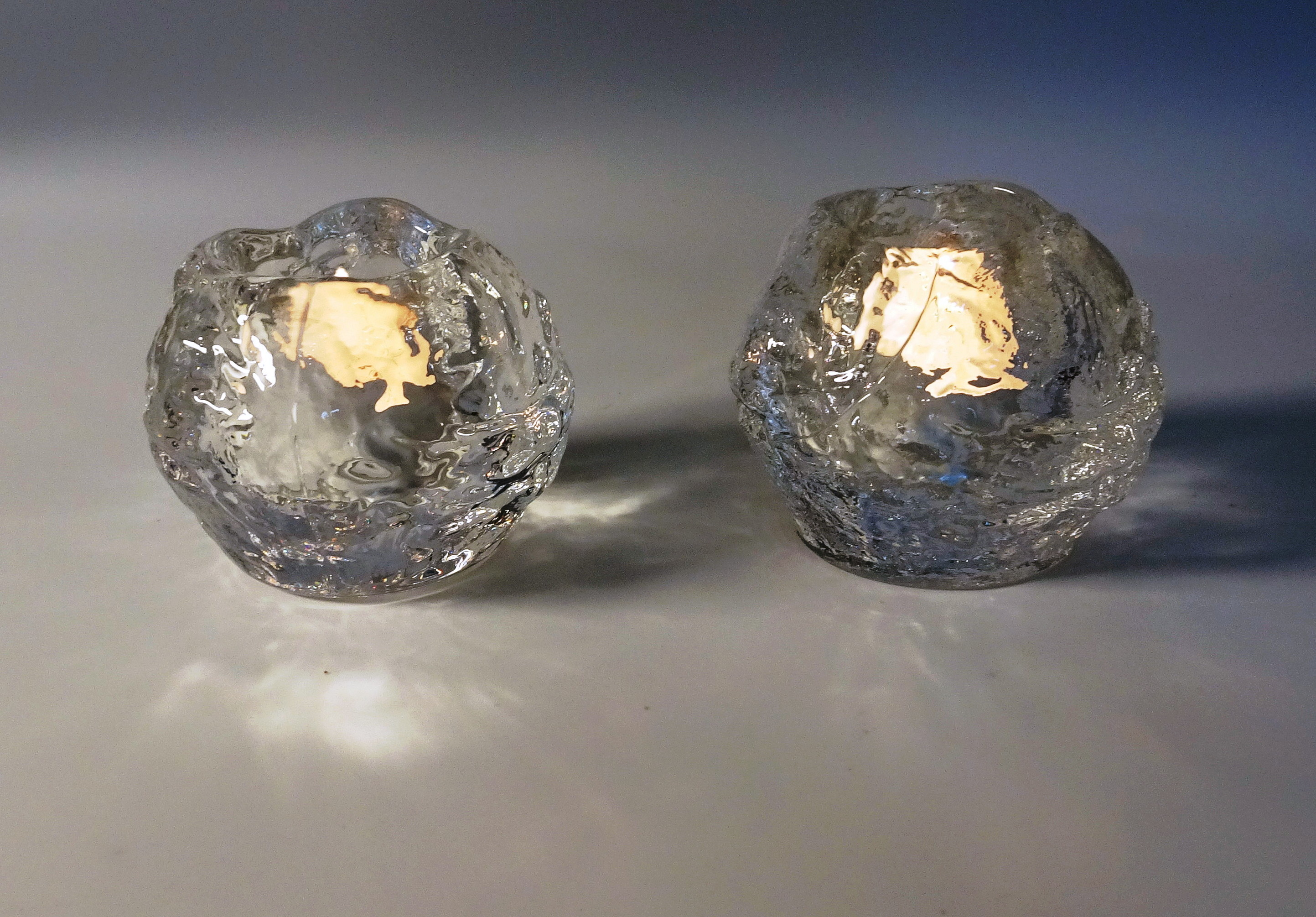
Snöbollen 'Snowballs' designed by Ann Wolff (1970s)

Kosta Boda (Swedish pronunciation: [ˈkǔːsta ˈbûːda]), formerly known as Kosta Glasbruk (IPA: [ˈkǔːsta ˈɡlɑ̂ːsbrʉːk]), is a Swedish glassmaking company that is a well known manufacturer of art glass and tableware. It is located in Kosta, Sweden, which was named for the company. The surrounding region has become known as the Kingdom of Crystal, and is now a tourist site which attracts a million visitors annually.

== History ==
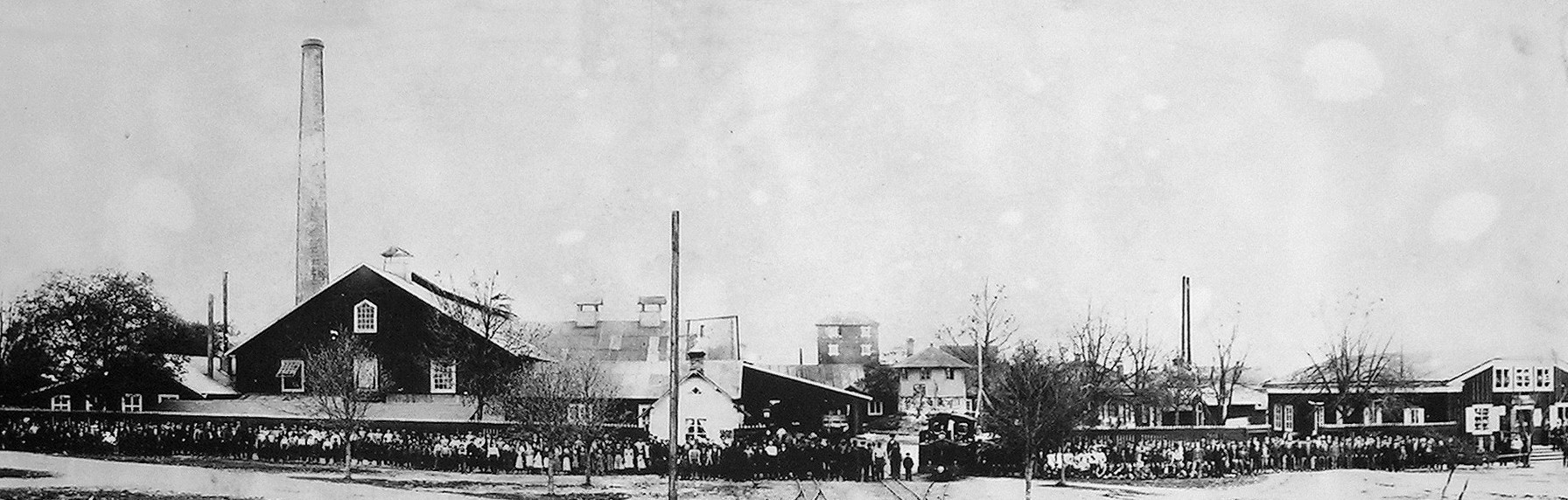
Kosta glasbruk (c. 1890)

Kosta Glasbruk was founded in 1742 by two officers in Charles XII's army, Anders Koskull and Georg Bogislaus Staël von Holstein. The name is a portmanteau of the founders' surnames, Ko(skull) + Sta(el) and Boda Glasbruk, which was a company in Emmaboda Municipality that was merged into Kosta Glasbruk. In 1903, the company also merged with the Reijmyre glassworks, although both entities retained their names. Kosta Glasbruk is active today under the name of Kosta Boda. Since 2005, it has been part of Orrefors Kosta Boda, a subsidiary of the New Wave Group.

Early production consisted of window glass, chandeliers and drinking glasses. From the 1840s, the factory was at the forefront of new trends and technical developments, producing pressed glass, and in the 1880s setting up a new glass-cutting workshop.

In 1898, the company hired the artist Gunnar Gunnarsson Wennerberg as its first in-house designer. Between 1928 and 1950 Elis Bergh was the artistic director of Kosta Glasbruk (after 1950 and until his death in 1954, Bergh worked as a consultant for Kosta).

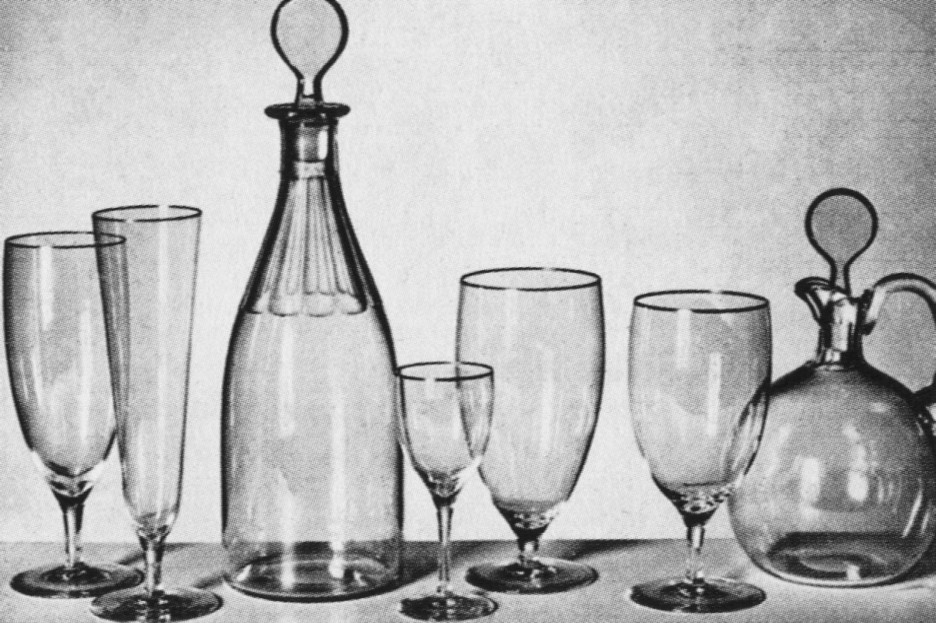
Elis Bergh designs (1936 photograph)

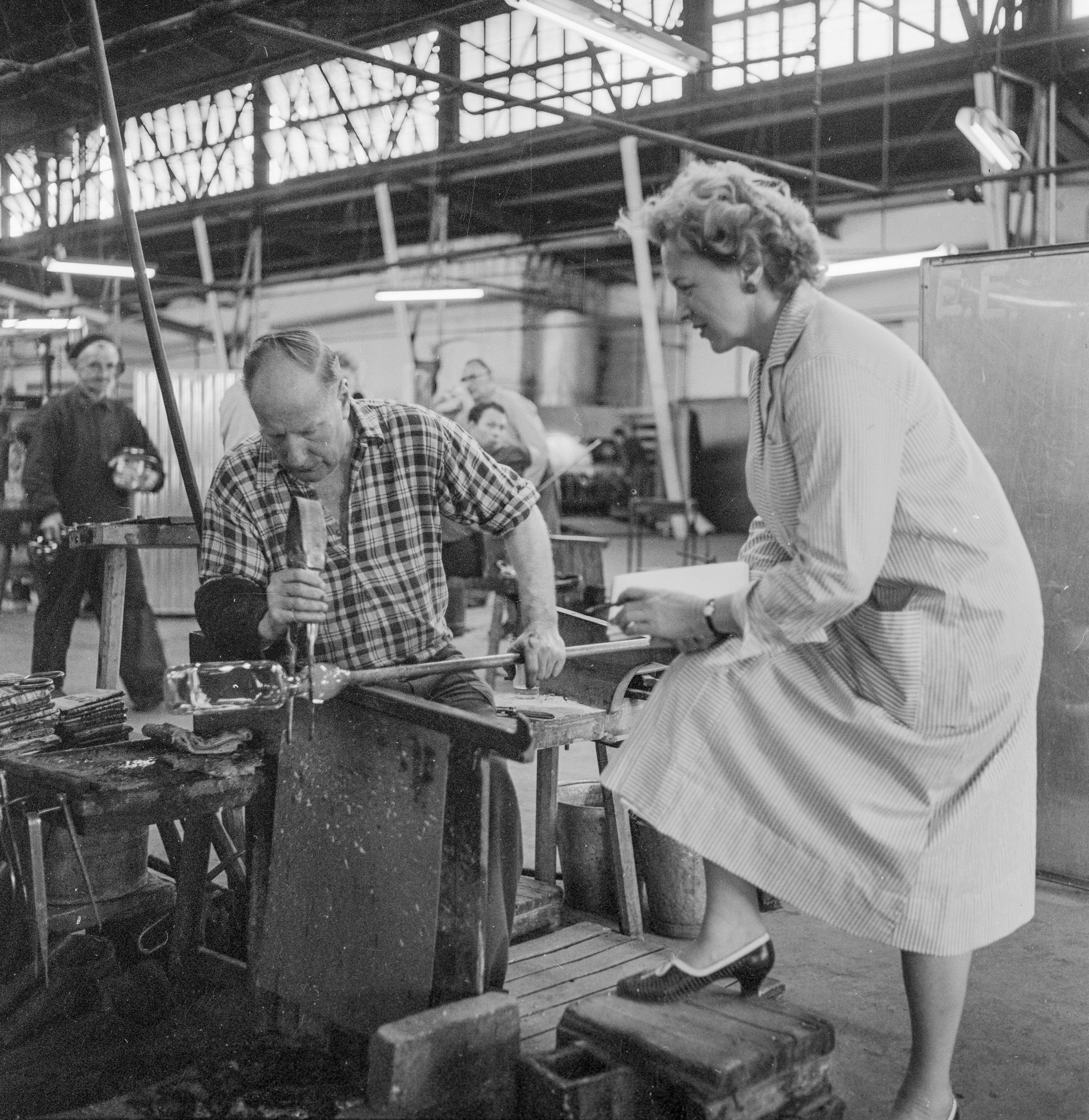
Mona Morales-Schildt at Kosta glassworks with unknown artisan (Göran Schildt photo)

The company has a history of working with well known artists and designers such as Monica Backström, Ewald Dahlskog, Anna Ehrner, Sven Erixson, Erik Hoglund, Åsa Jungnelius, Tyra Lundgren, Mona Morales-Schildt, Edvin Ollers, Sven Erik Skawonius, Ulrica Hydman Vallien, Bertil Vallien, Goran Warff, and Ann Wolff.

In the 1950s Vicke Lindstrand, who served as the company's artistic director from 1950 to 1973, commissioned the architect Bruno Mathsson to design several buildings for Kosta. These included an exhibition hall and a row of terraced worker's houses. The latter, known as the Kosta Glashus, was granted legally protected Byggnadsminne 'Building Monument' status by the Swedish National Heritage Board in 2007.

In 1990 Orrefors bought Kosta Boda.

Objects made by Kosta are in collections such as the Swedish National Museum, Smålands museum, National Museum of Norway, the Victorian and Albert Museum in London and the National Museum of Wales, Museum Boijmans Van Beuningen in the Netherlands, as well as the Brooklyn Museum, Metropolitan Museum and Museum of Modern Art in New York.

Kosta Boda is also known as the maker of the Eurovision Song Contest trophy since 2008, and the Women’s World Championship International Handball Federation trophy since 2023.

== Gallery ==
=== Views of the Kosta factory buildings and town ===
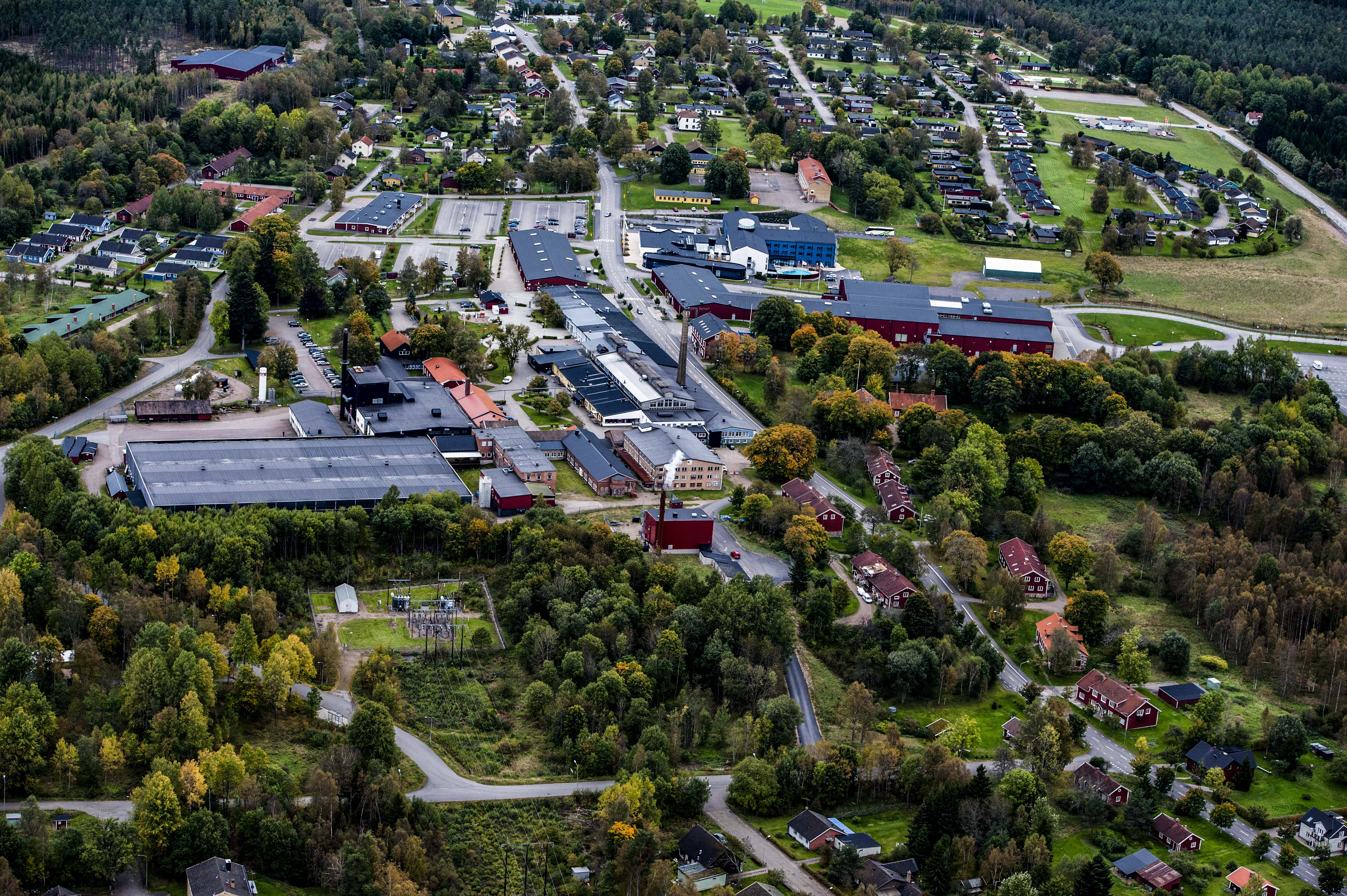
Aerial view, Kosta site

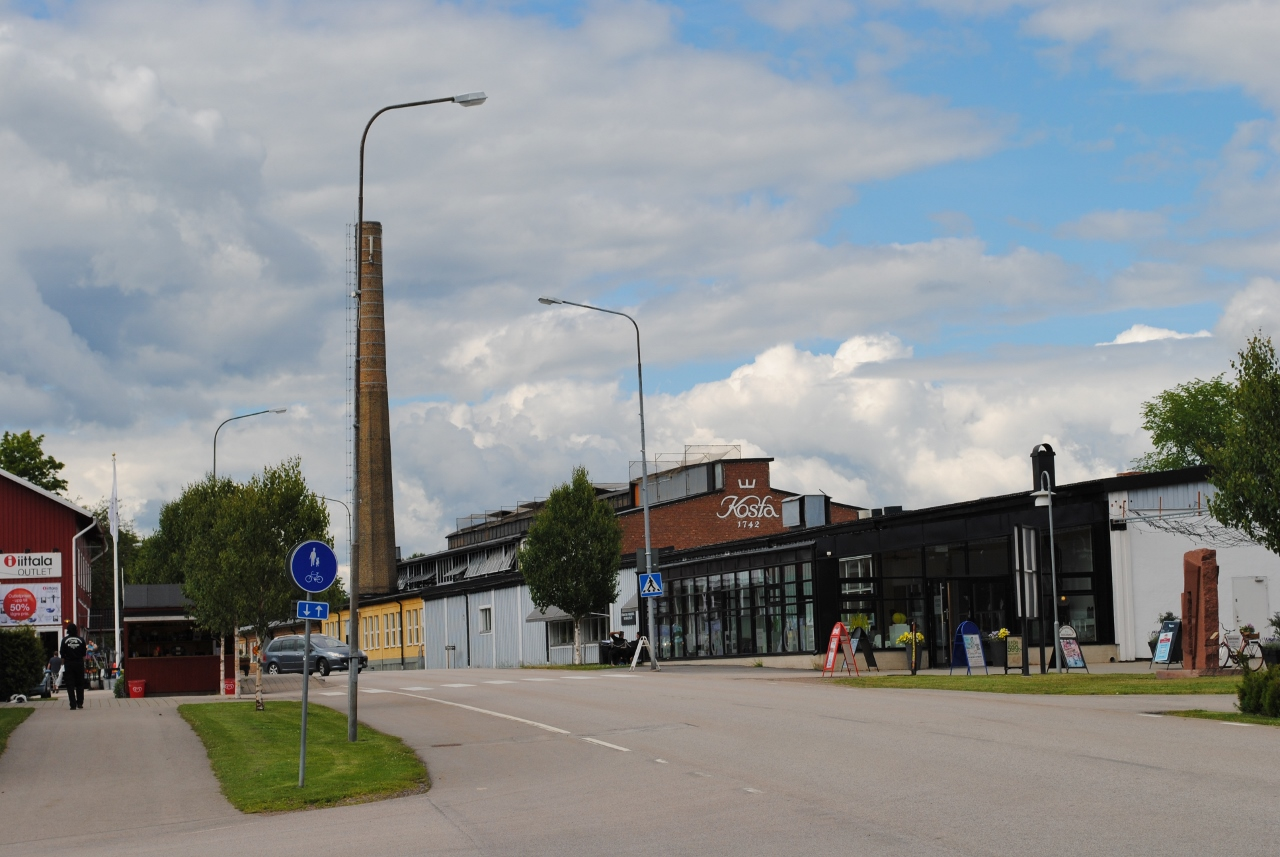
Main Street, Kosta

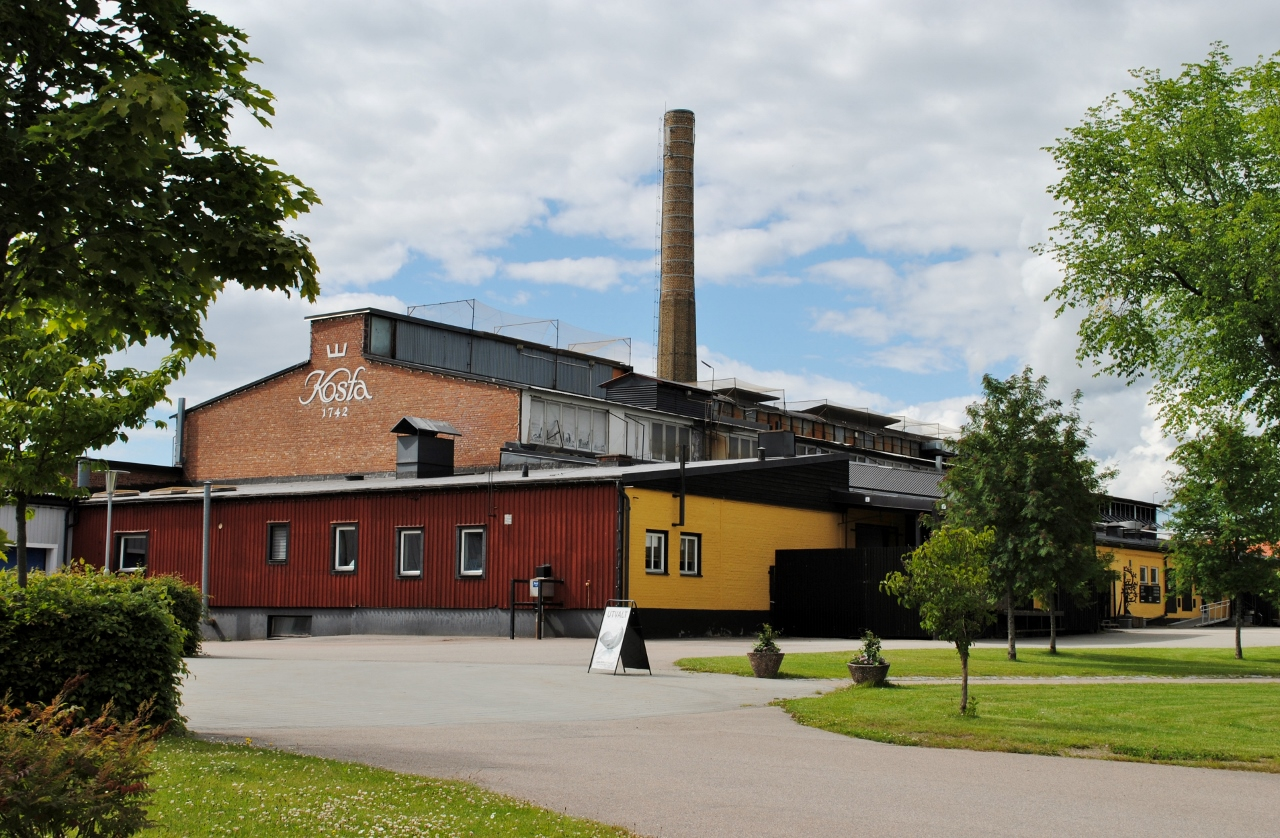
Kosta Boda foundry

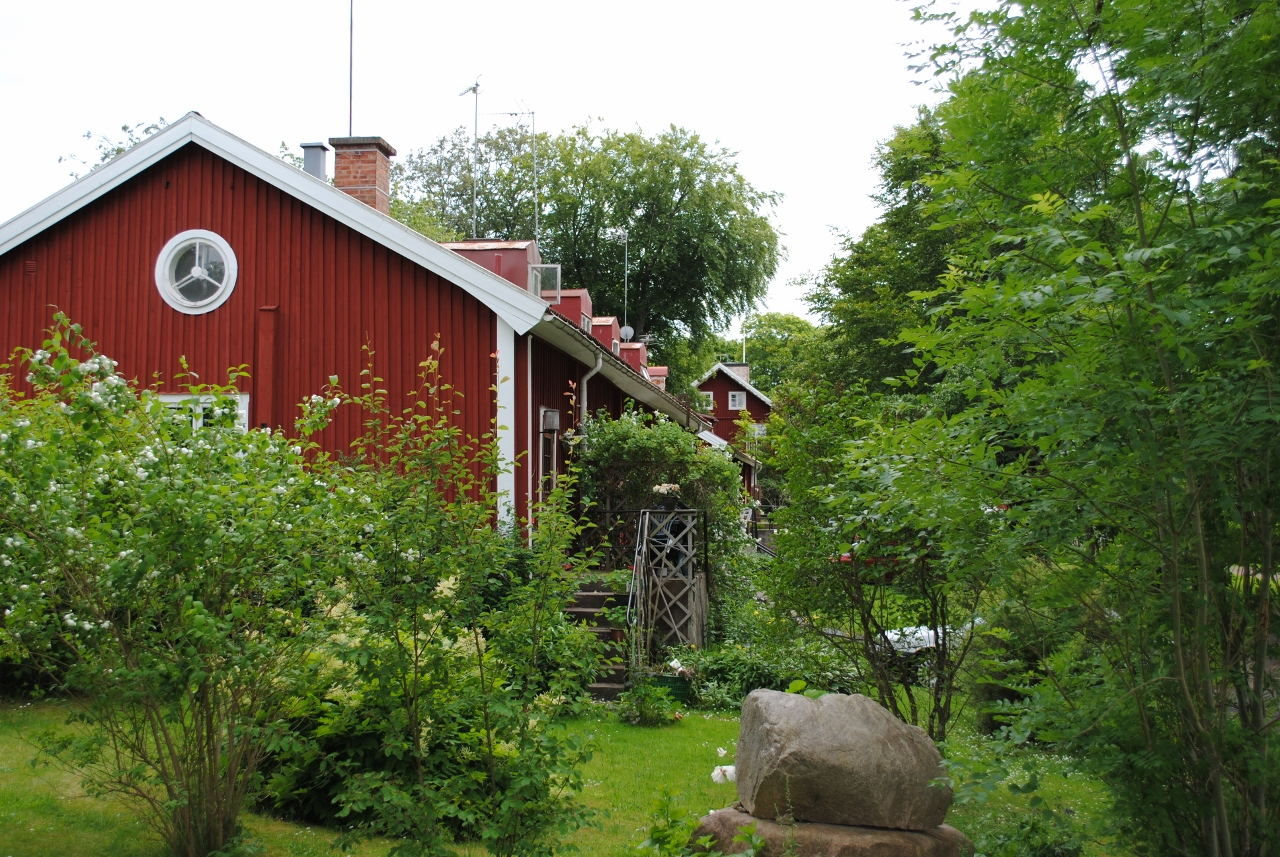
Factory grounds

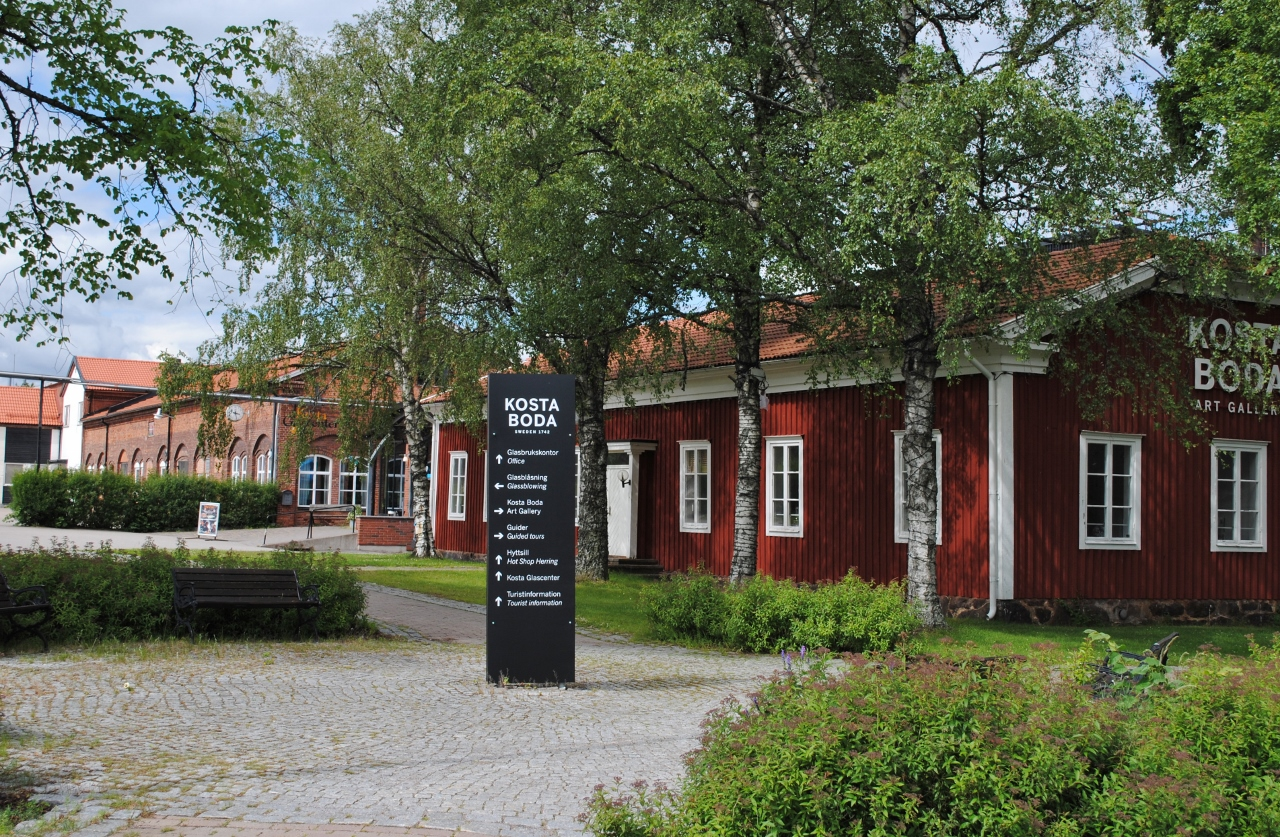
Art Gallery

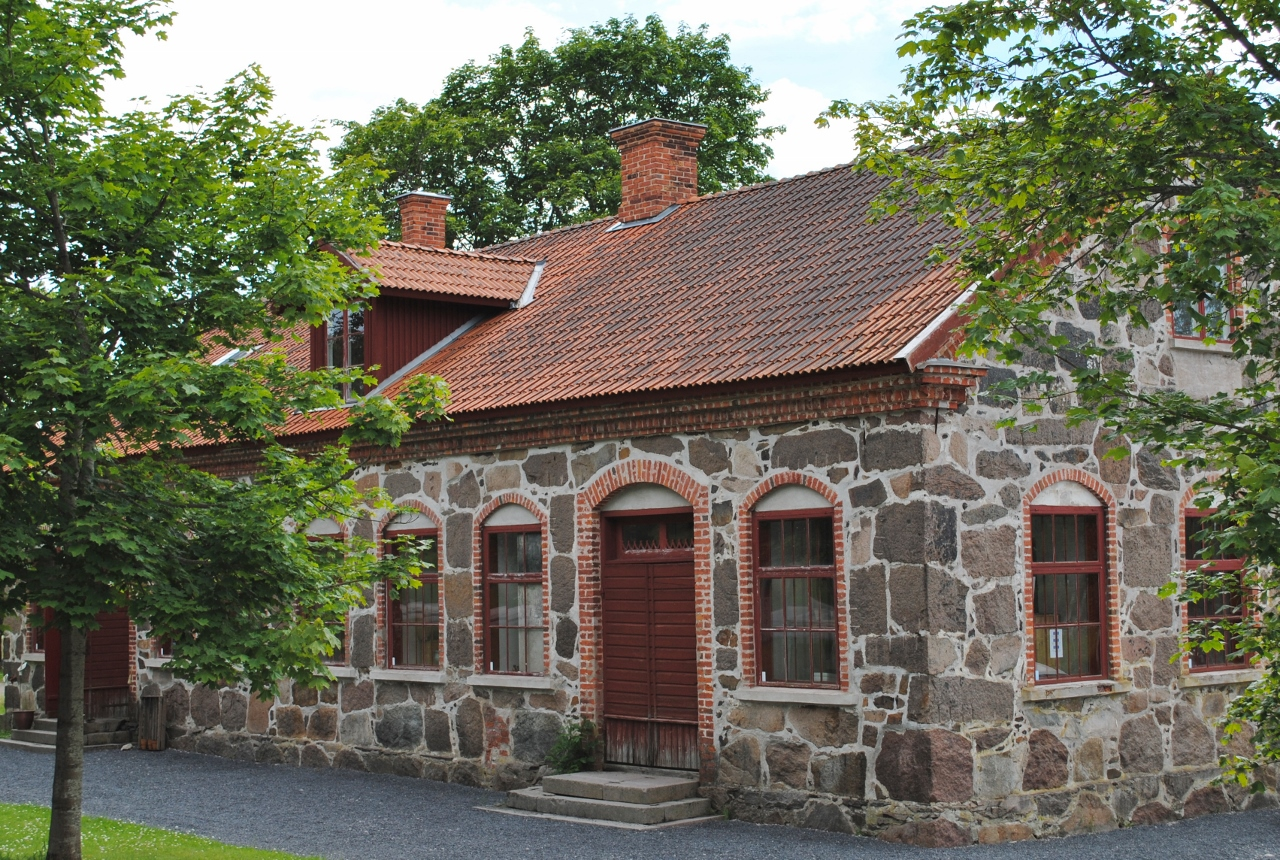
Stenmagasinet 'The stone magazine'

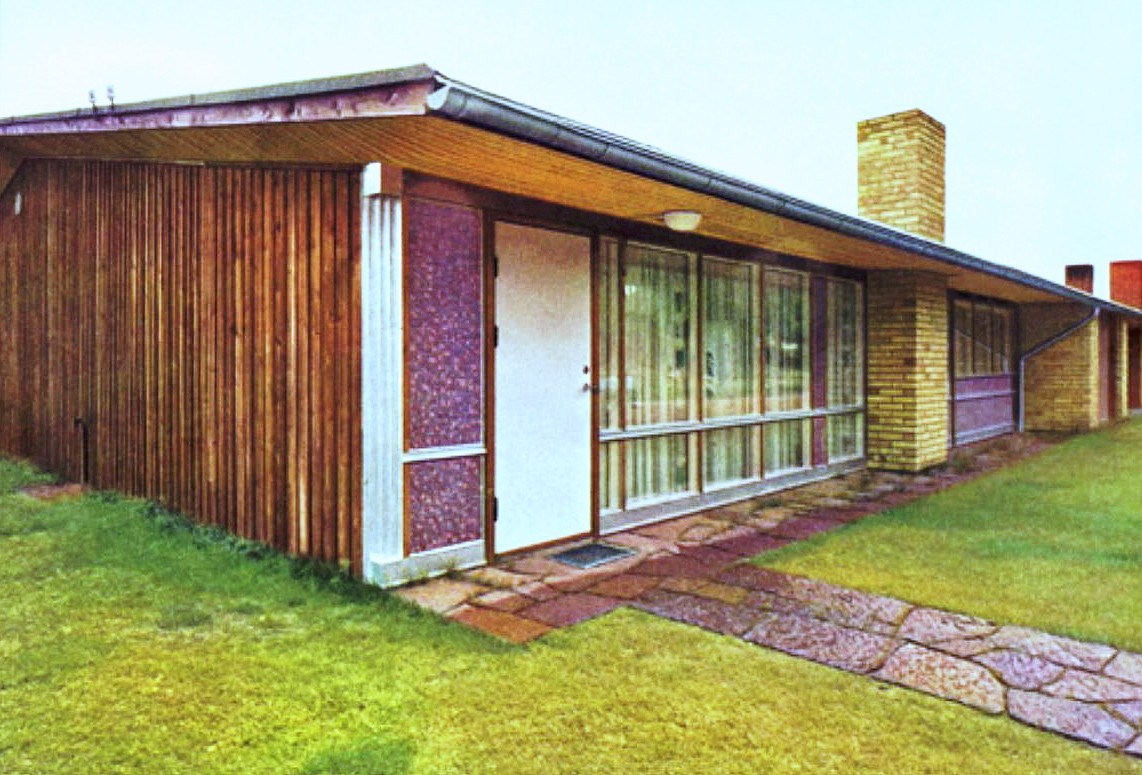
Kosta Glashus by Bruno Mathsson

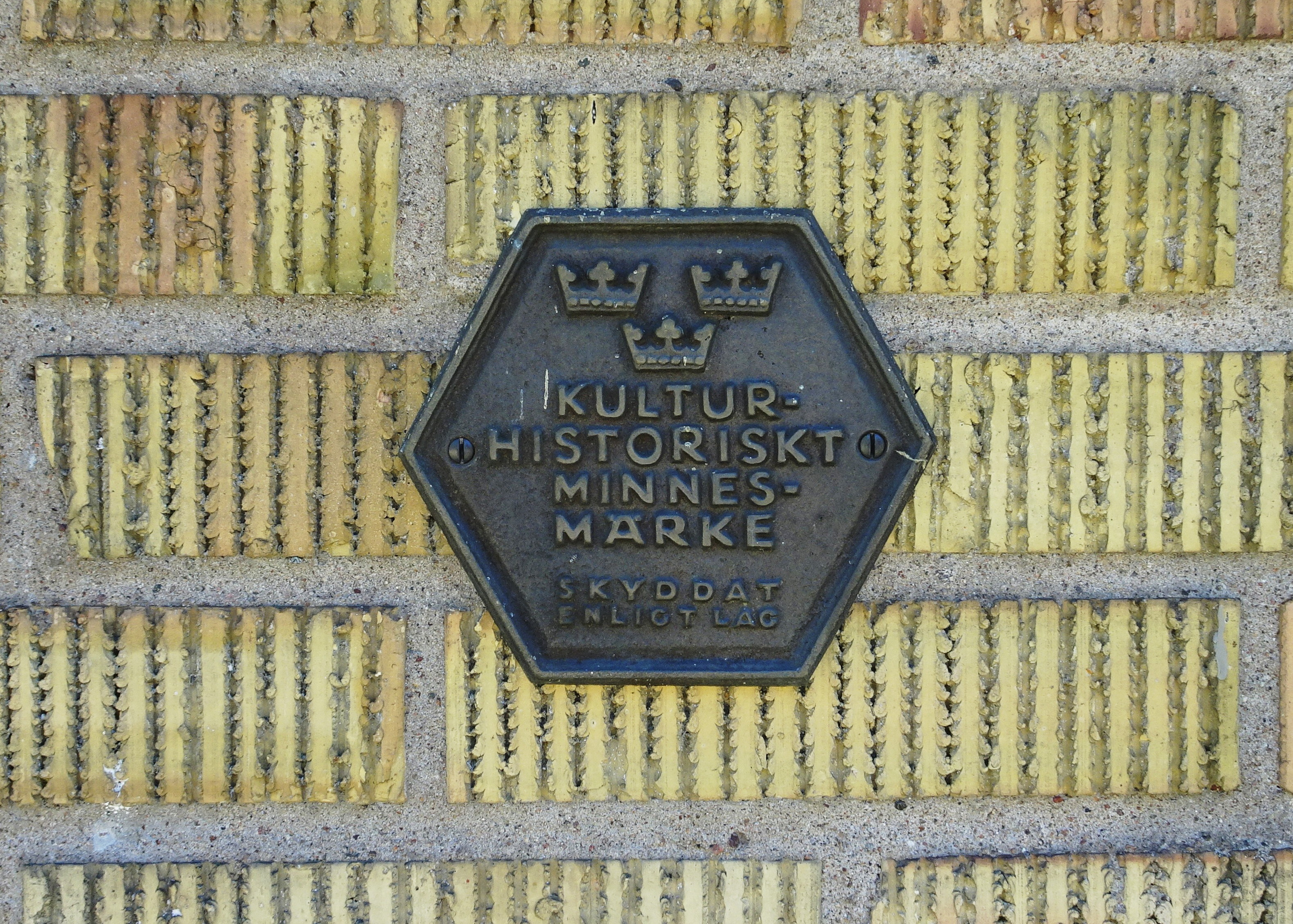
Cultural Heritage plaque, Kosta Glashus

=== Glass making process ===
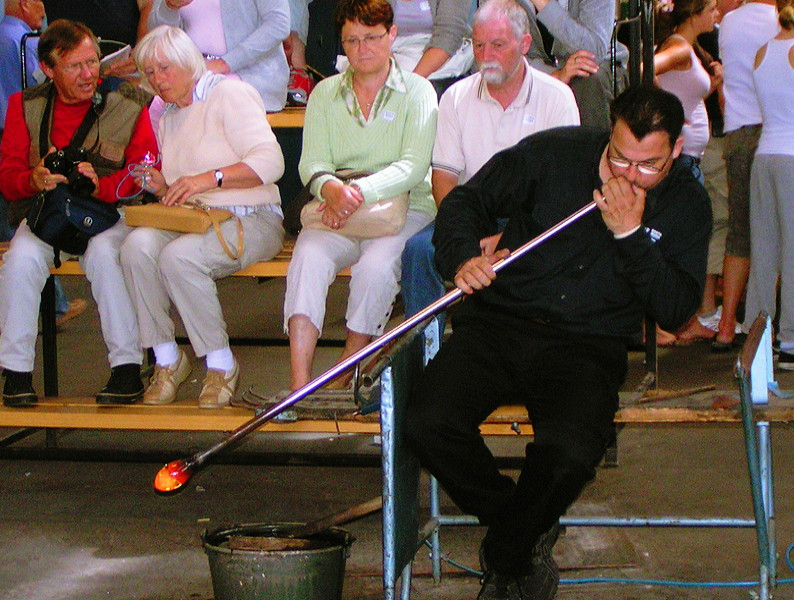
Glassblowing demonstration

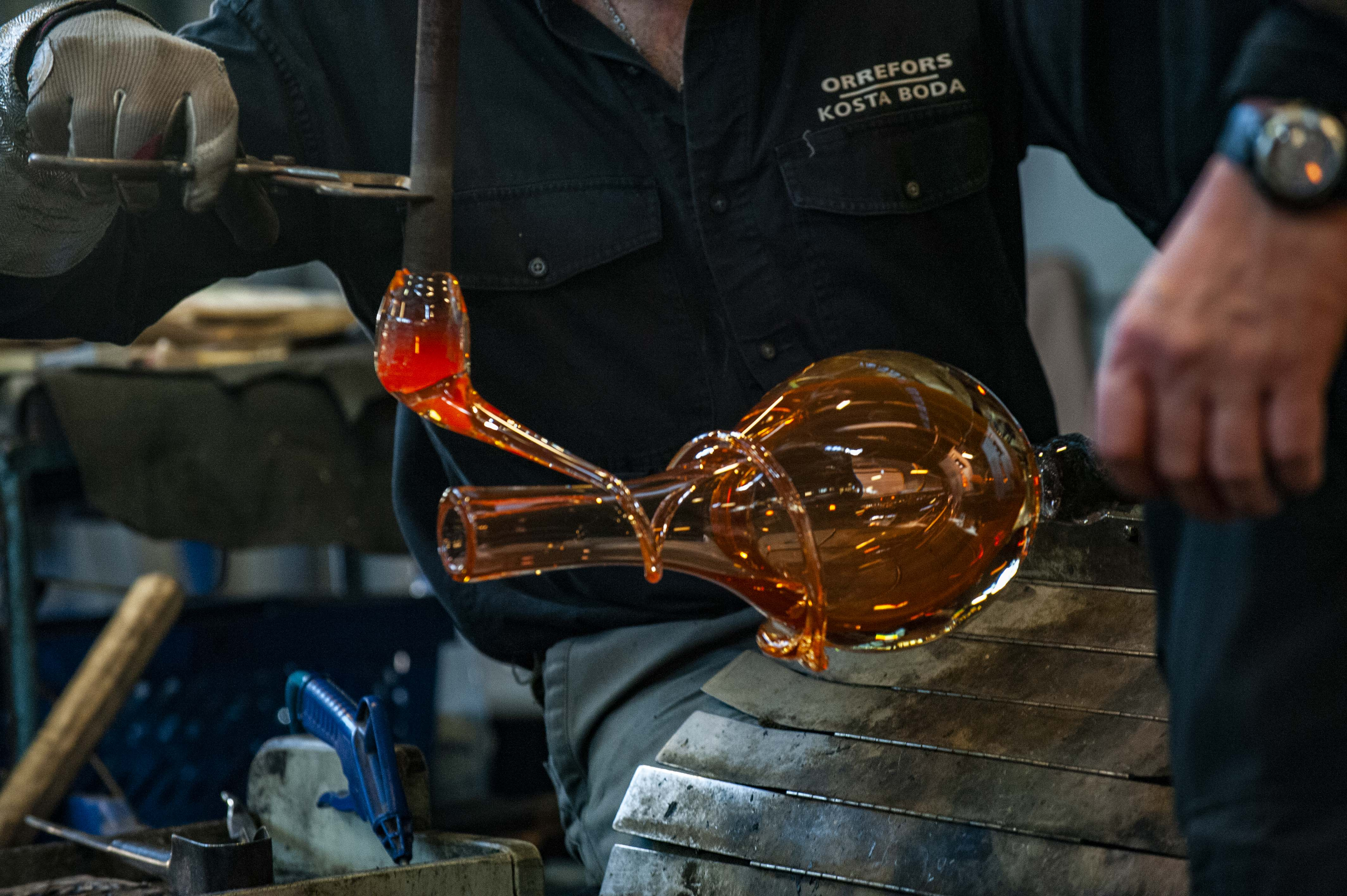
Glassblowing

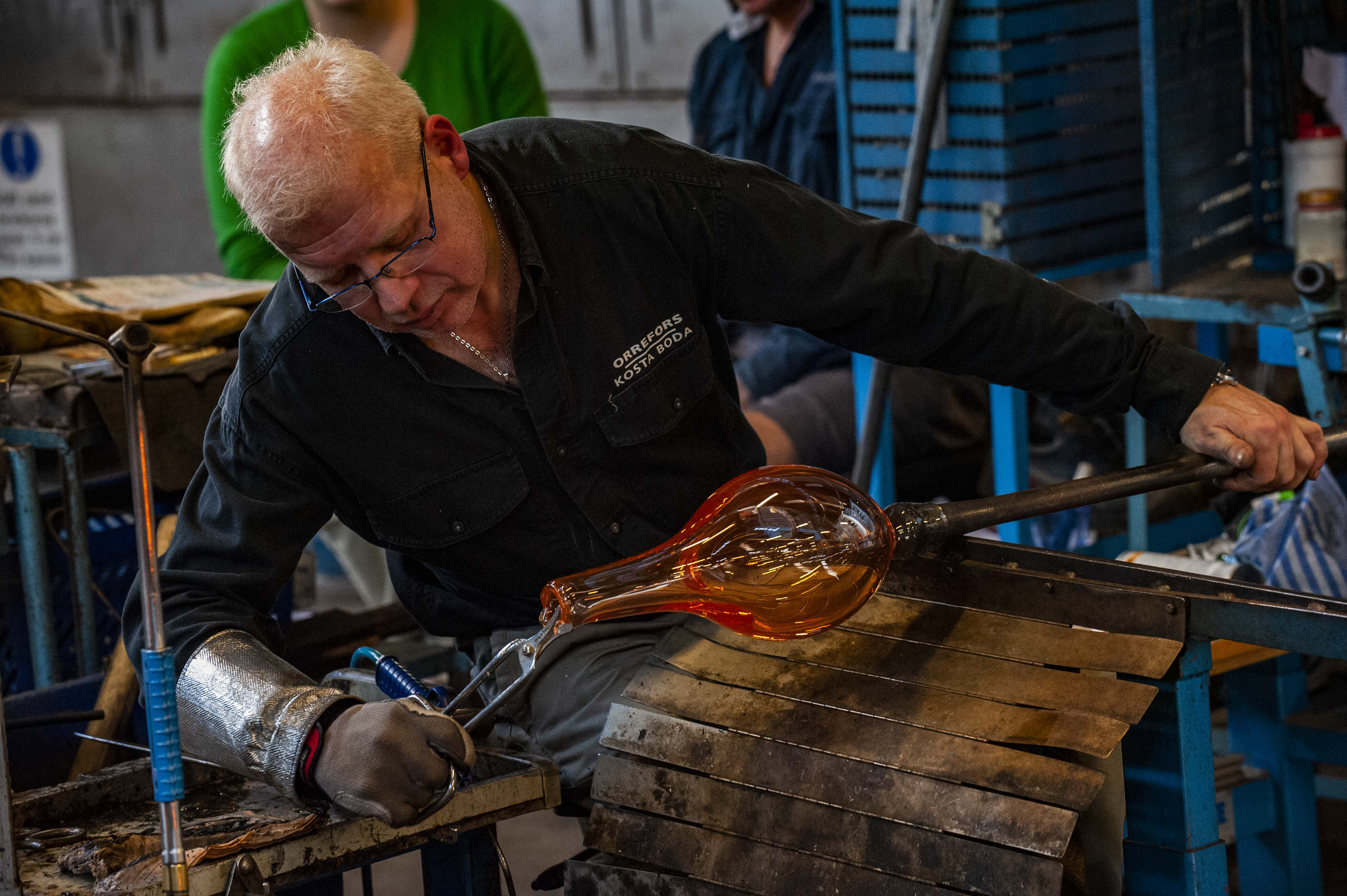
Glassblowing

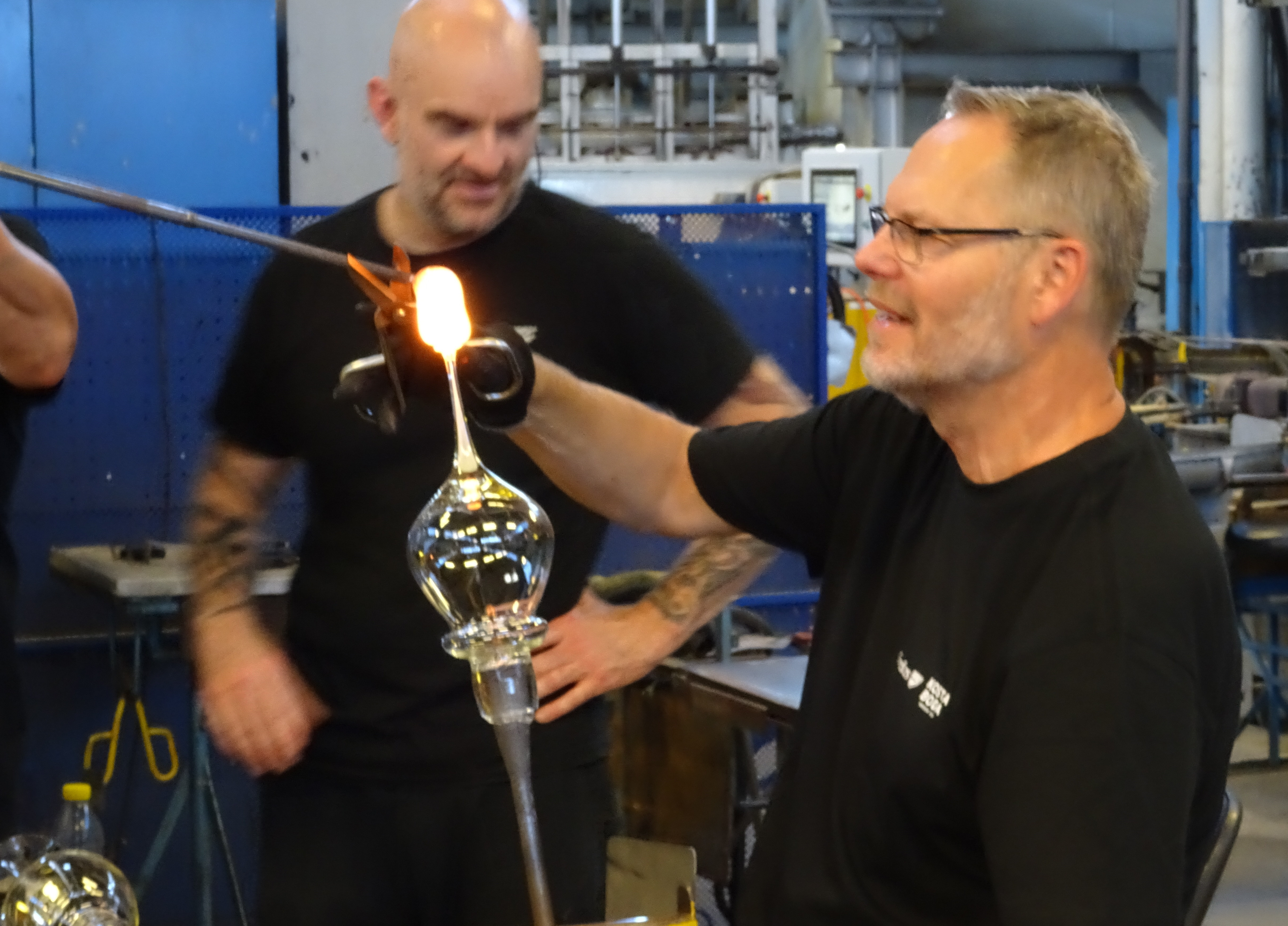
Glassblowing

=== Glass by Kosta Glasbruk ===
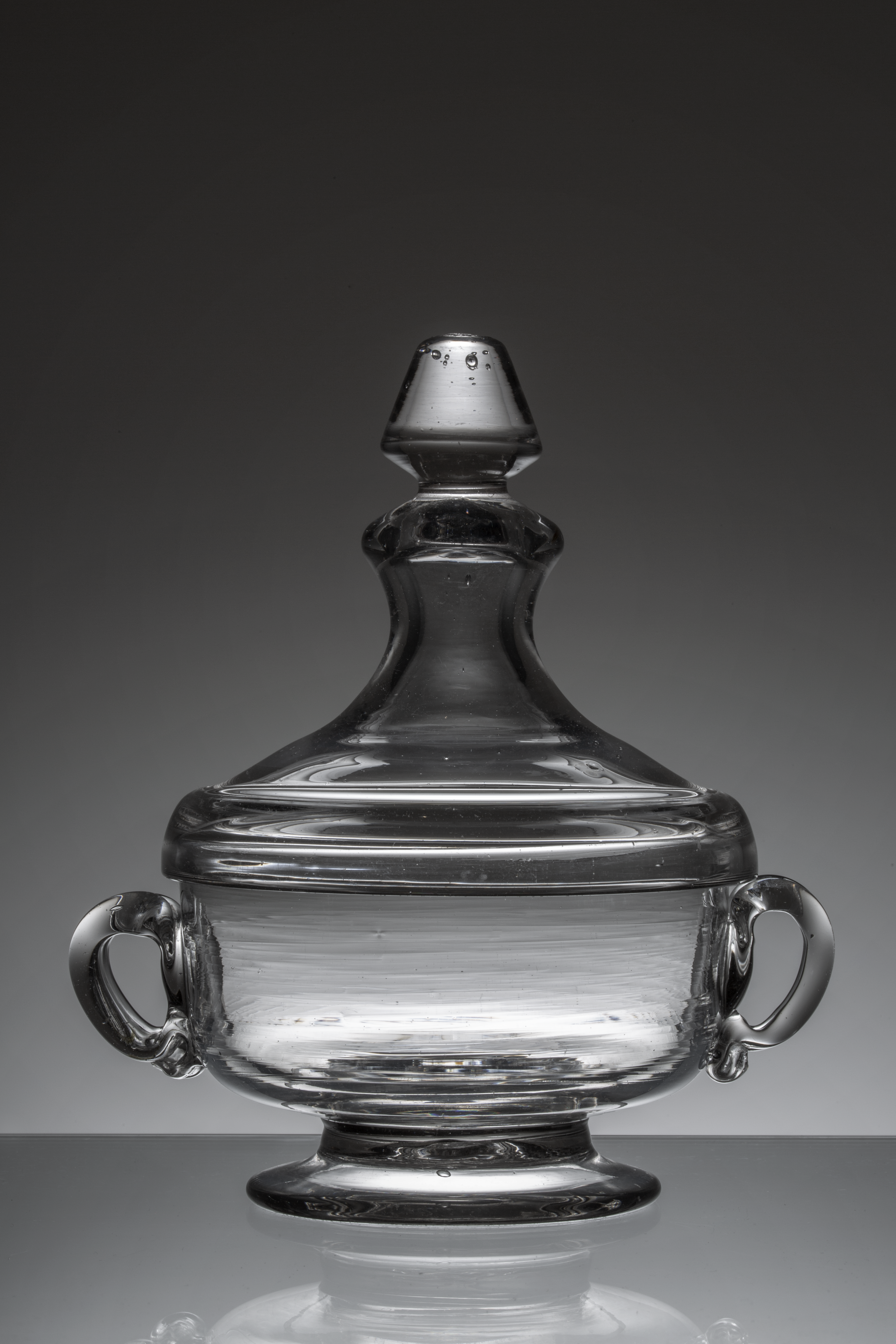
(c. 1800)

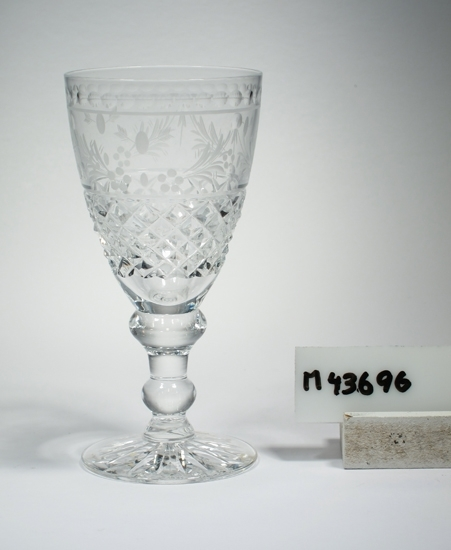
Elvira Madigan service

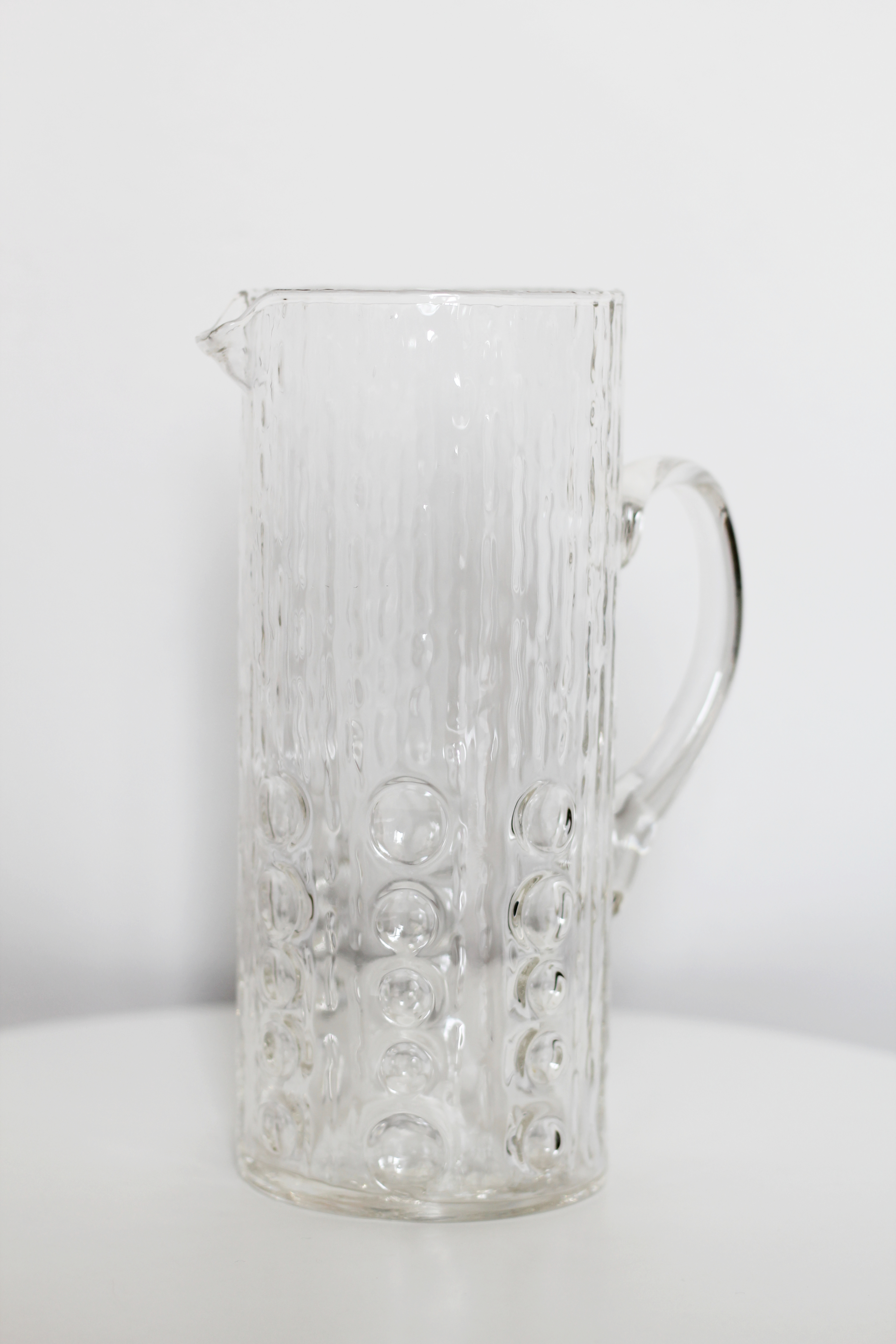
Pitcher

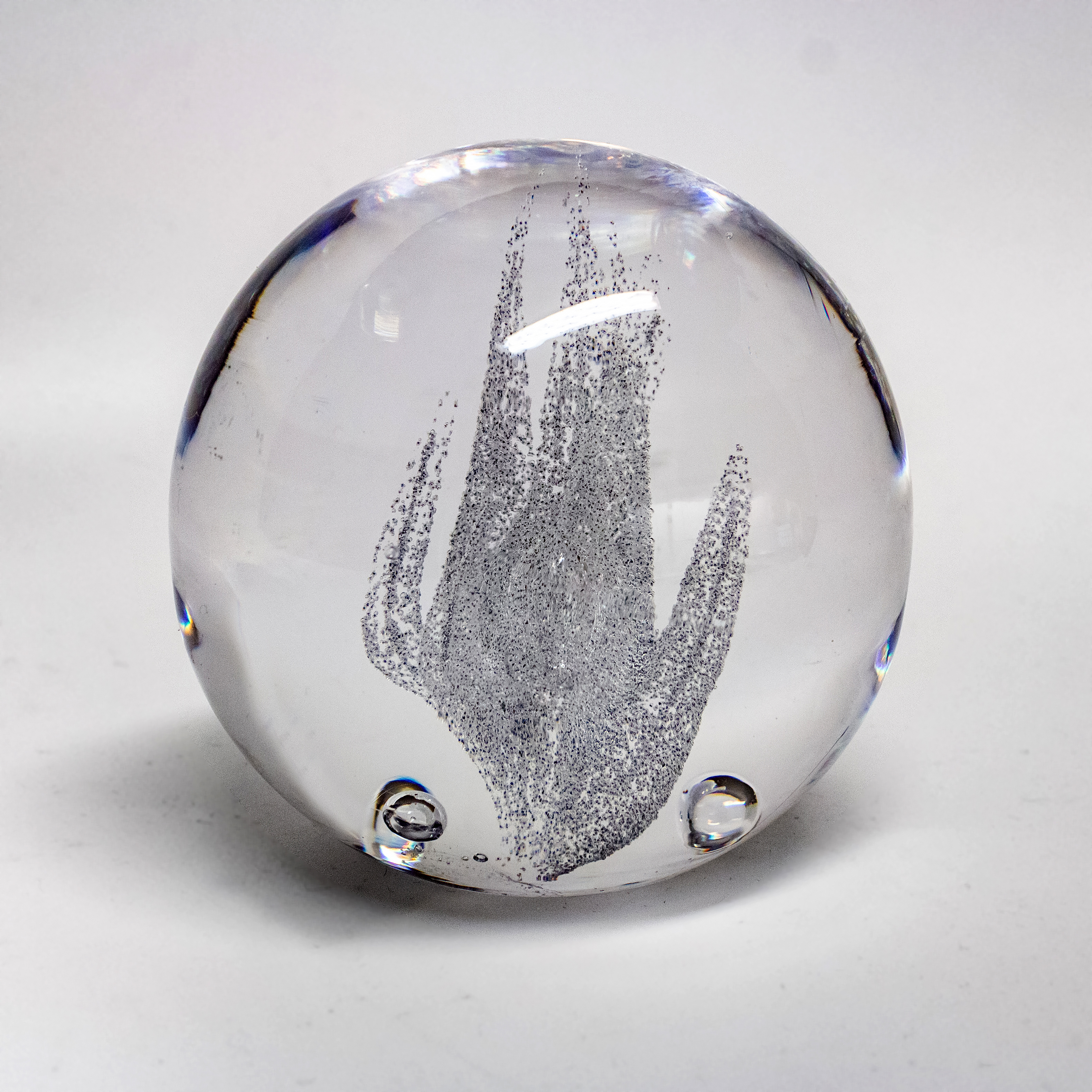
Crystal paperweight

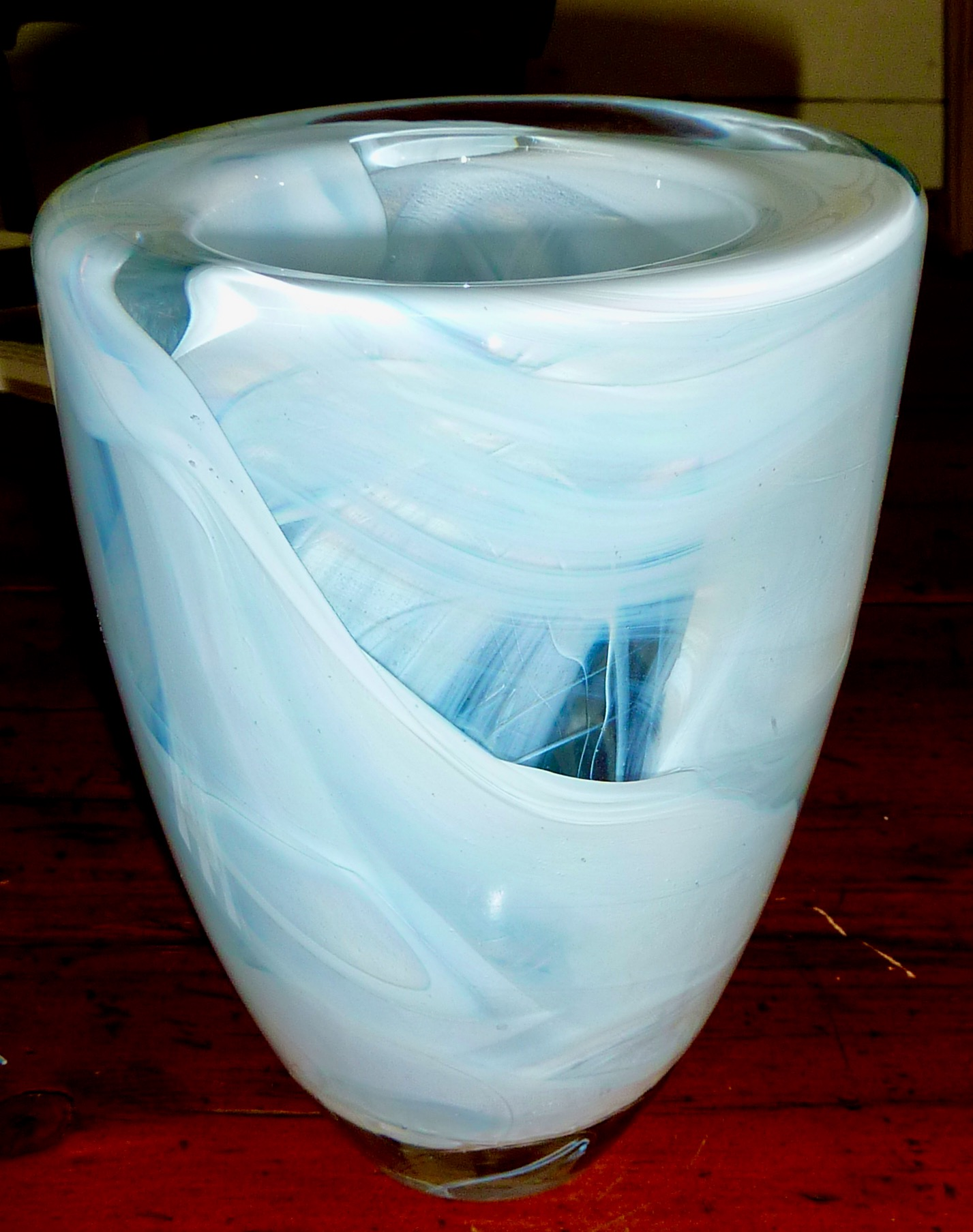
Vase

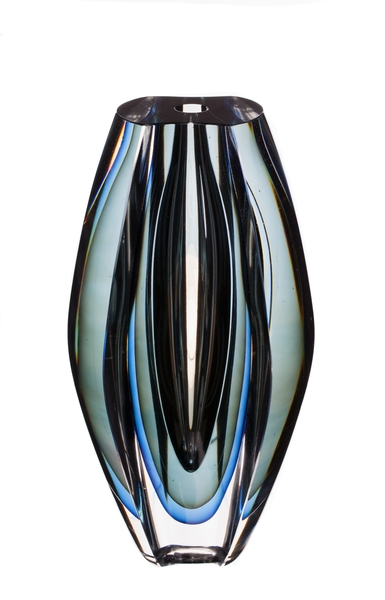
Vase by Mona Morales-Schildt

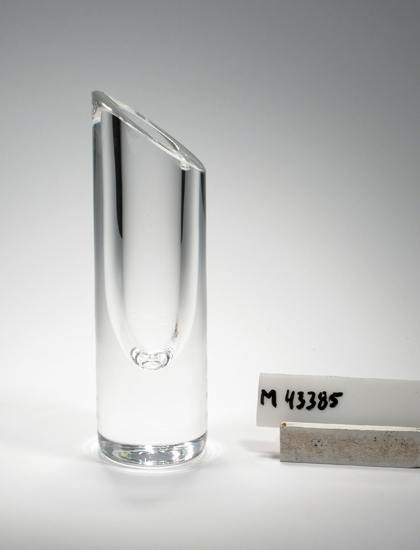
Vase by Christian von Sydow

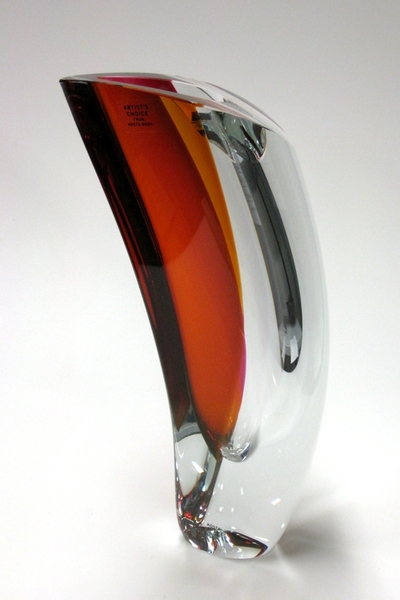
Vase by Göran Wärff

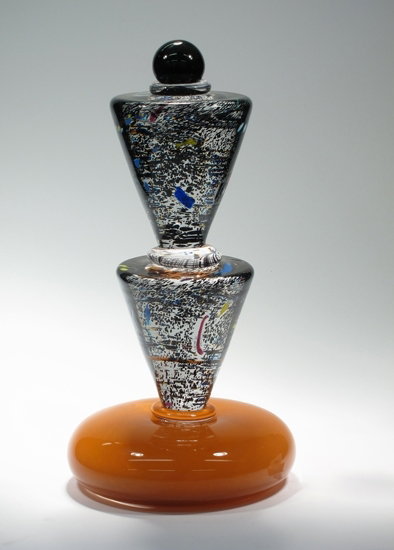
Vase by Gunnel Sahlin (1989)

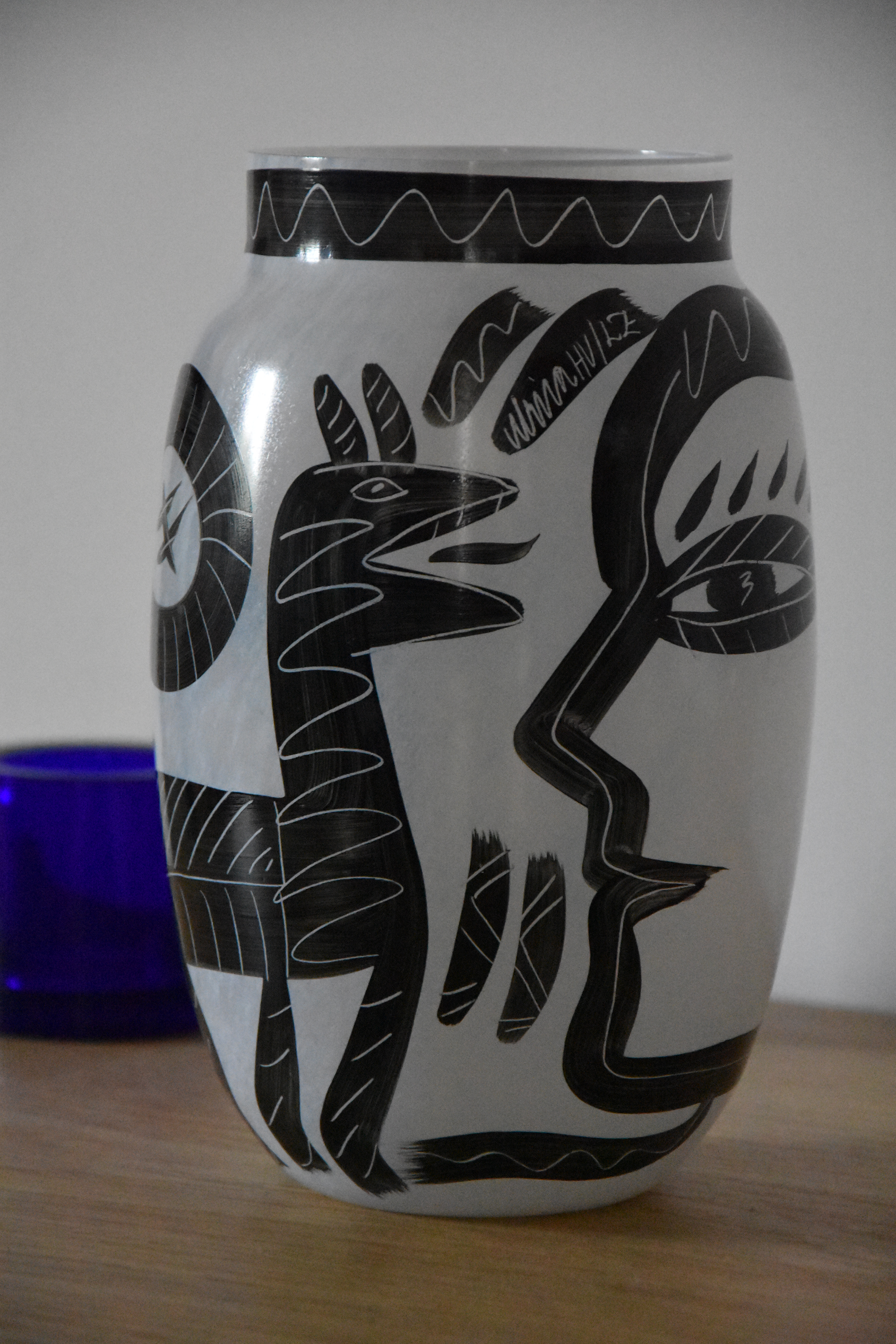
Vase by Ulrica Hydman Vallien (2001)

=== Kosta Glashus by Bruno Mathsson ===
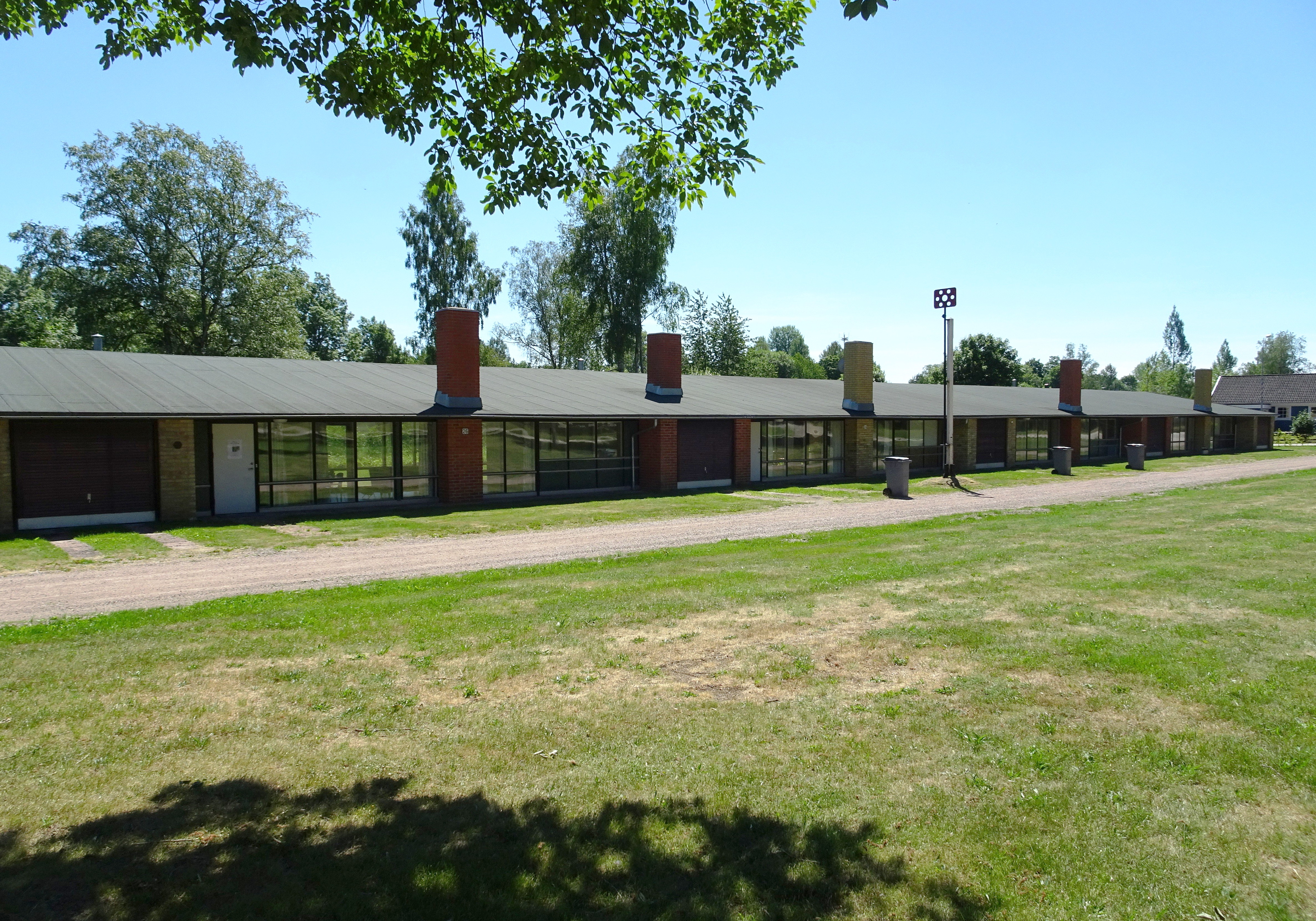

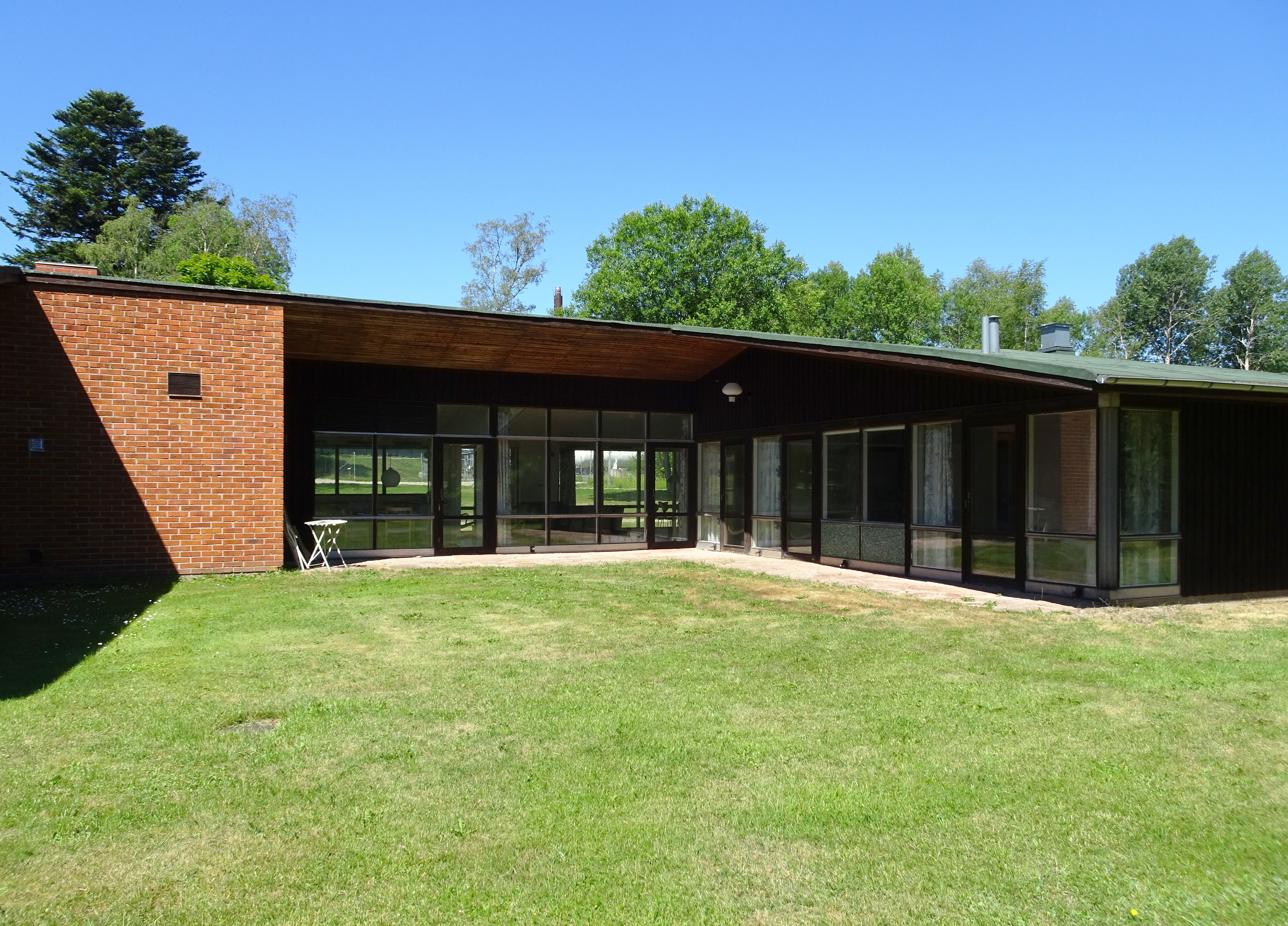

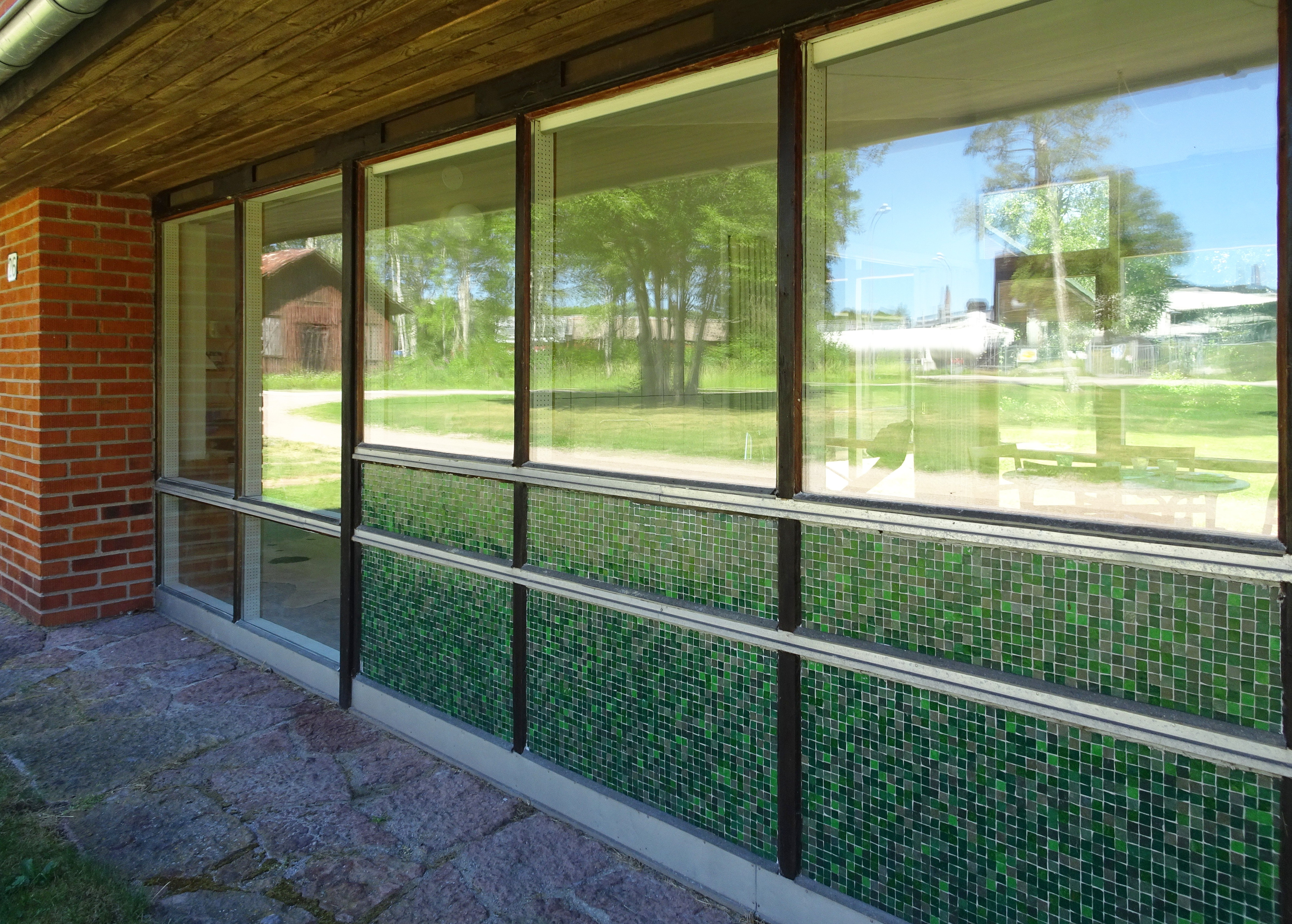

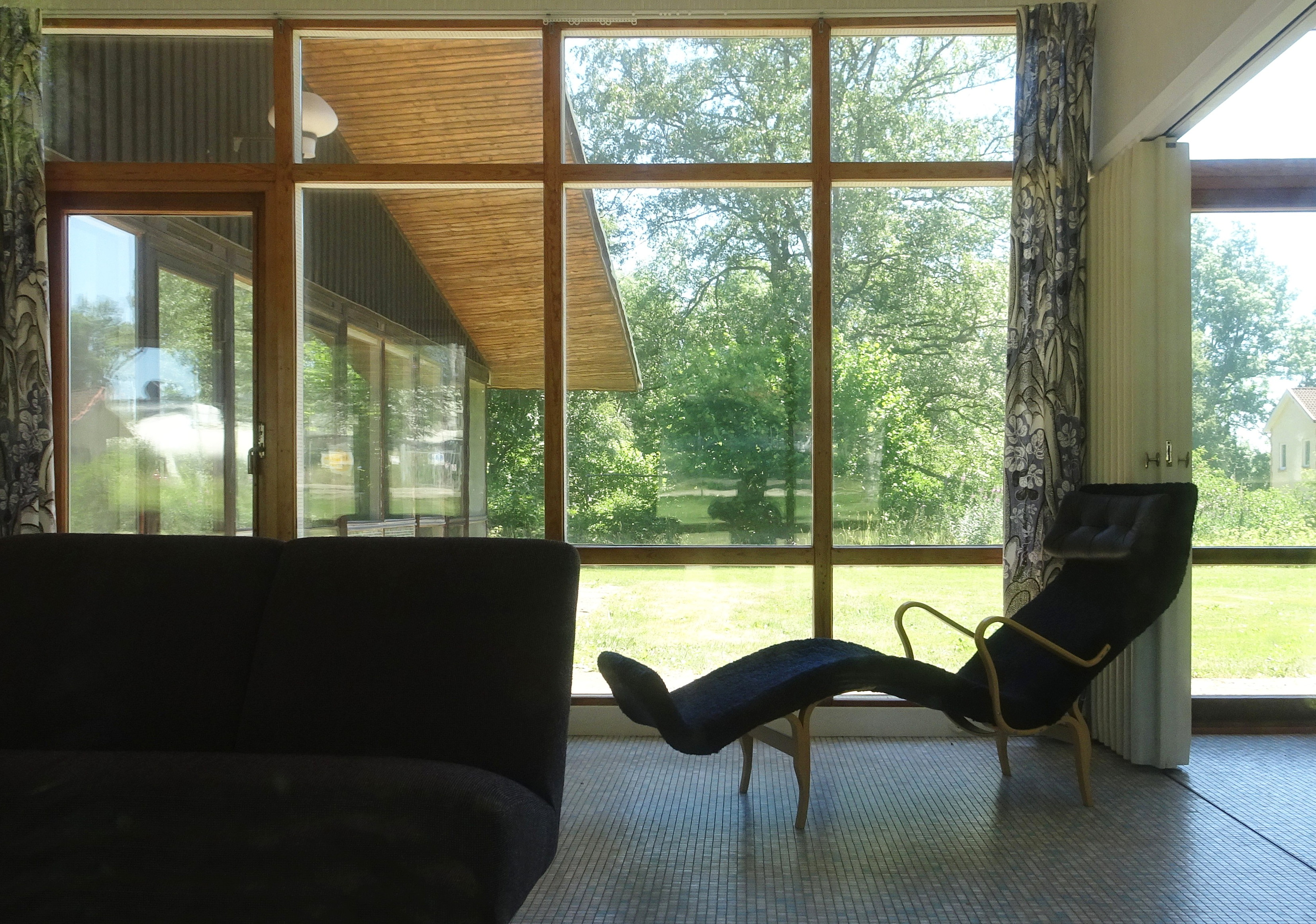

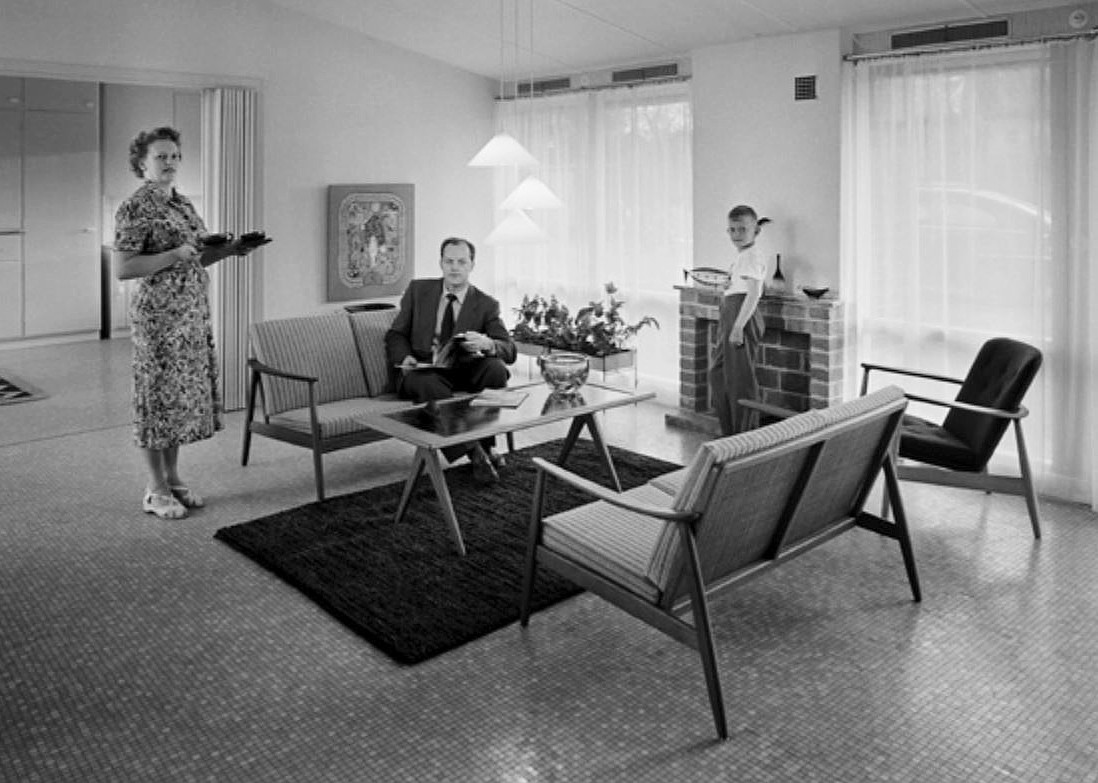

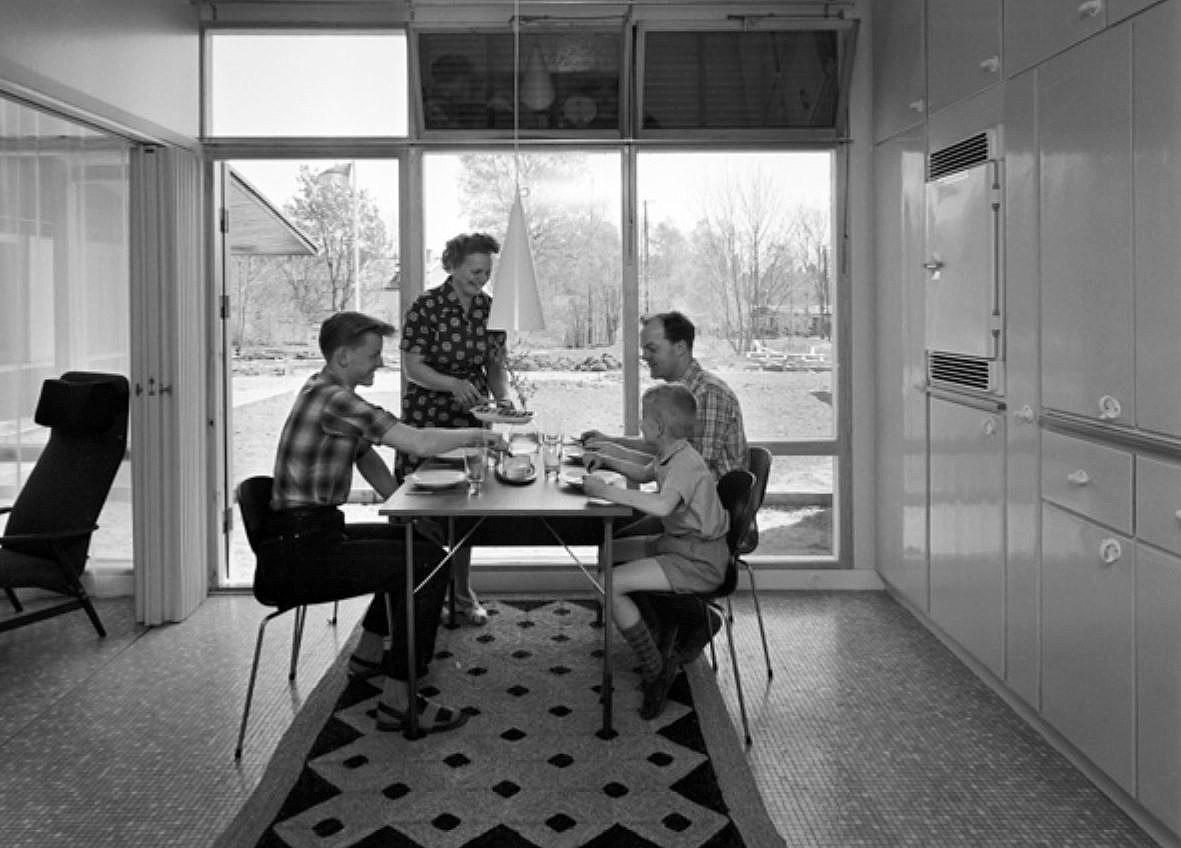

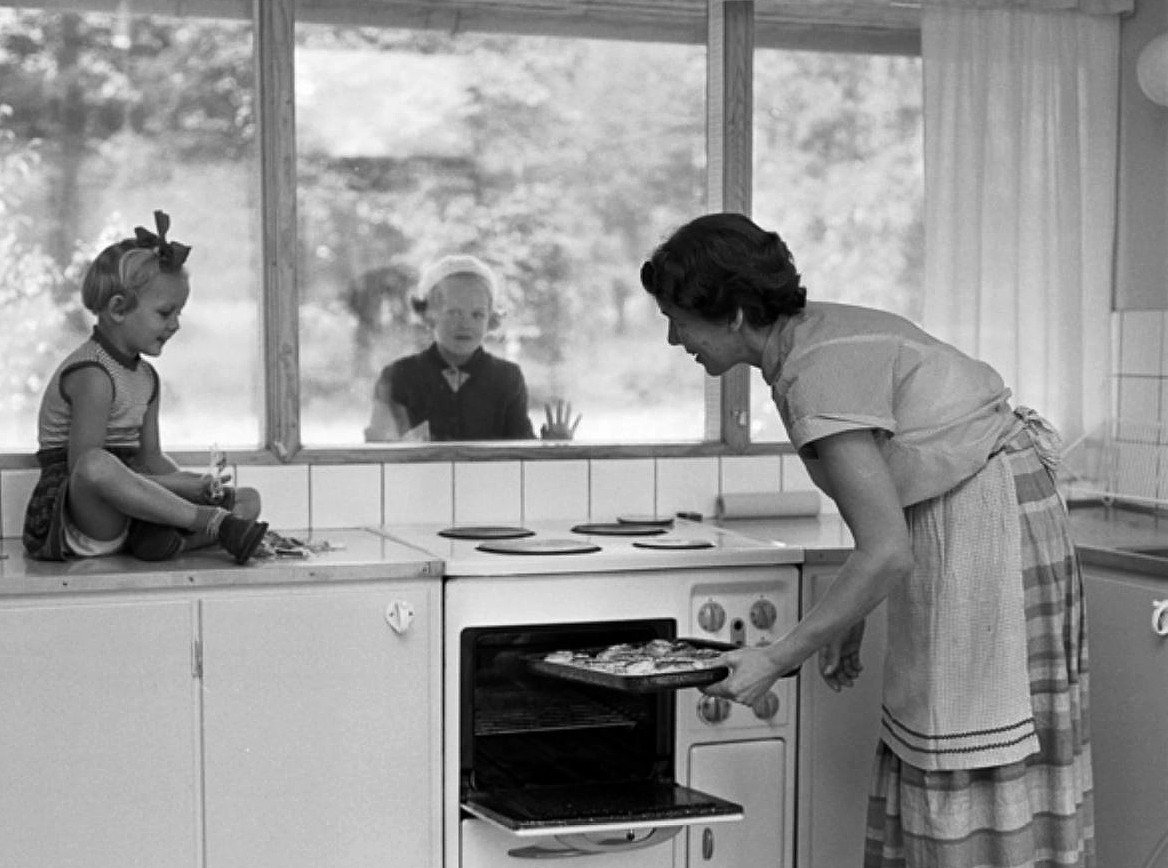

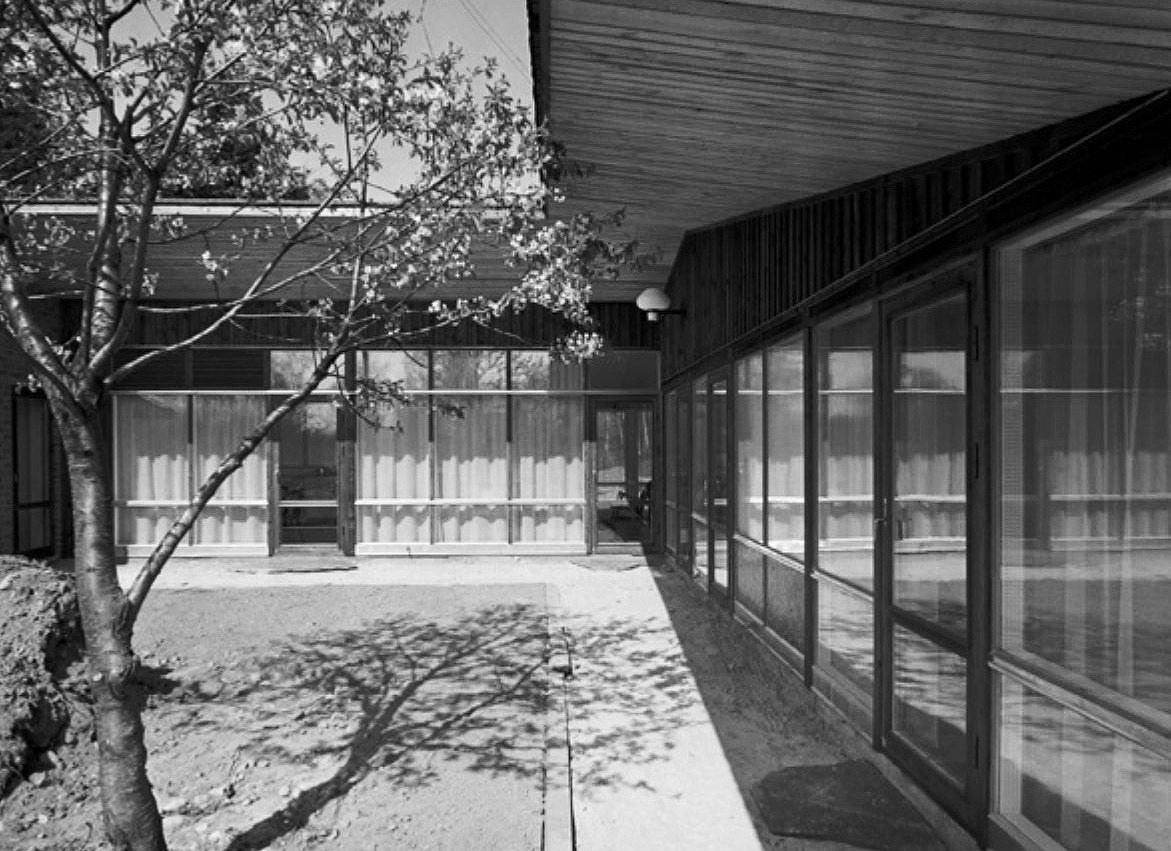
