= Kingdom of Crystal =

Area of Sweden rich in glassworks

Road sign

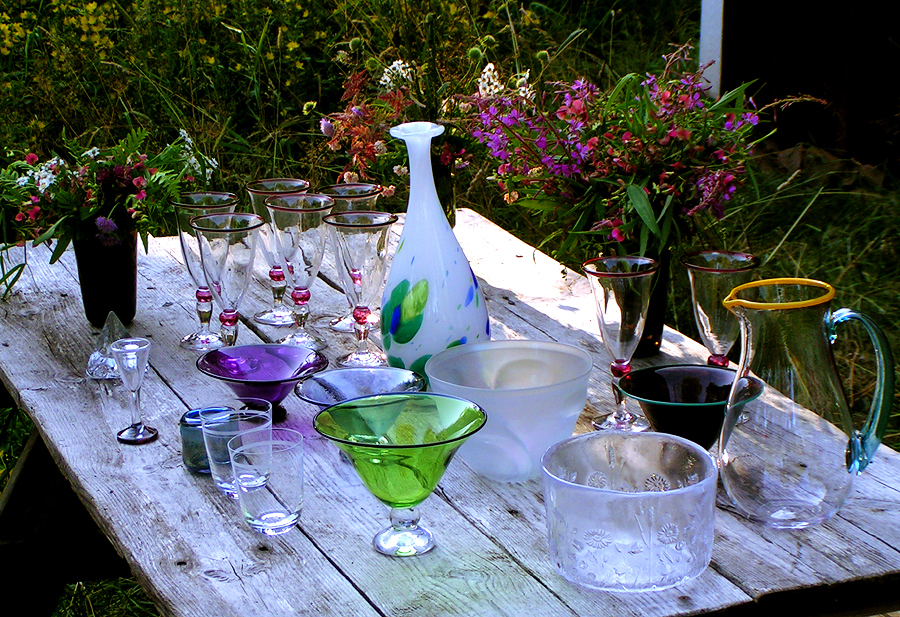
Shopping examples from the Kingdom of Crystal

The Kingdom of Crystal (Swedish: Glasriket, The glass realm) is a geographical area today containing a total of 14 glassworks in the municipalities of Emmaboda, Nybro, Uppvidinge, and Lessebo in southern Sweden. The two municipalities Emmaboda and Nybro belong to Kalmar County and Lessebo and Uppvidinge belong to Kronoberg County. The area is part of the province Småland, and Nybro is considered the capital of the Kingdom of Crystal area. The Kingdom of Crystal is known for its handblown glass with a continuous story since 1742. The glassworks have become part of the culture of Sweden; examples can be found in many Swedish homes, recognisable by a small sticker at the bottom with the name Orrefors, Kosta Boda, etc. The height of glass production was the end of the 19th century during which 77 glass factories were established with more than half of them situated in Småland.

When touring the forested province of Småland in Sweden, it is normal to visit at least one of the glassworks. The larger ones have adjacent museums and are open for visitors to see the glass blowing hall, normally looking down from a platform. Food is available as well as shopping for various glass products such as glasses, bowls, vases and unique glass ornaments. The Kingdom of Crystal is a popular and a well known tourist destination. The Regional Council of Kalmar County conducts a study every four years to survey the Swedish public regarding their knowledge and awareness about Kalmar County, its places to visit and tourist attractions. The survey was conducted by Kantar Sifo and included 1500 respondents aged 20–79 years old. The survey results found that the Kingdom of Crystal area was the most visited tourist attraction in the Kalmar County attracting a wide range of people. One in five aged 40–79 years old had visited the area in the last five years. The visitors had no significant difference in terms of geographical belonging, income or gender. The only difference that could be noted was that the group visiting the area tended to be of older age rather than young. Among the respondents aged 40–65+ years old only 3% claimed they never heard of the Kingdom of Crystal.

The more notable are Orrefors Glasbruk, with the adjacent National School of Glass and Kosta Boda. Each one of the glassworks have distinctive design traditions, character and atmosphere.

== Companies ==
=== Glassworks ===
- Hitorp Glasbruk
- Målerås
- Kosta Boda
- Orrefors
- Sea
- Nybro
- Sandvik
- Bergdala
- Rosdala
- Johansfors
- Lindshammar
- Strömbergshyttan
- Pukeberg (founded 1871)
- Åfors
- Transjö hytta

=== Smaller glasswork-related companies ===
In the Kingdom of Crystal, there are a large number of small businesses in the glass industry, which are often spin-offs from some of the larger companies. Activities of these businesses include:

- Studio glass
- Glass engraving
- Glass repair
- Glass painting
- Design

=== Training ===
- Riksglasskolan in Orrefors
- Glasskolan in Kosta (Secondary school, the Nordic line, Commissioned, Vocational Education)
