= Lundrigan =

Lundrigan is a surname. Notable people with it are:

- Arthur Lundrigan (1922–2000), Canadian businessman
- Donald D. Lundrigan (1910–1990), American politician
- Harold Lundrigan (1928–2009), Canadian construction businessman
- John Lundrigan (1939–2009), Canadian politician
- Joe Lundrigan (born 1948), Canadian ice hockey defenceman
- Nicole Lundrigan (born 1972), Canadian author; John's daughter

== See also ==
- Lundgren
