= Lundgren (disambiguation) =

Lundgren is a Swedish surname. It may also refer to:

- Lundgren and Maurer, an American architectural firm active from 1950 until 1973
- Lundgren Monuments, a funeral monument and design business founded by Greg Lundgren
- Lundgrenfjellet, a mountain on Svalbard, named after Swedish geologist Bernhard Lundgren
- Lundgreni Event, an extinction event indirectly named after Bernhard Lundgren
