= Christian Rex van Minnen =

American contemporary artist

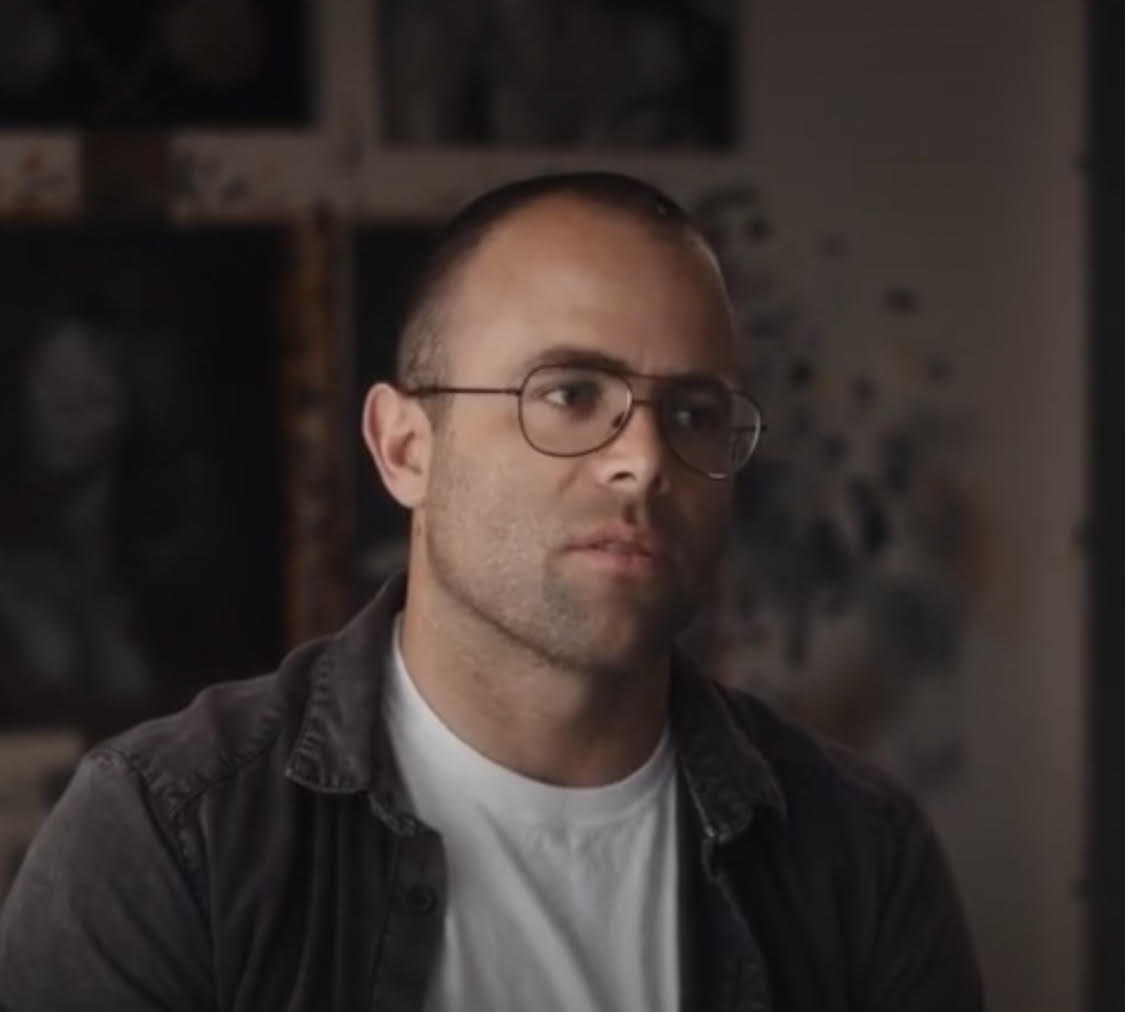
- Born: 1980 (age 45–46); Providence, Rhode Island, U.S.
- Education: Regis University
- Known for: Printmaking, painting, ceramics
- Spouse: Ashley Muse
- Website: christianrexvanminnen.com

Christian Rex van Minnen is an American contemporary artist.

== Biography ==
Christian Rex van Minnen was born in 1980 in Providence, Rhode Island, and grew up in Colorado. His father is a psychotherapist in Basalt, Colorado and was born in South Africa but did not have much direct contact. His uncles were fishermen and had a fish market in Charlestown, Rhode Island, called Rathbones. He always doodled in high school and was introduced to painting before going to university. He graduated with a BA degree from Regis University in 2002.

He chose painting as a profession starting in 2005–2006. Early in his career he worked on a smaller scale of 18x24 inches. These were more personal pieces. Later, he moved to a larger scale and had to change his technique, remove some of the complexity, and try not to fill every square inch on the canvas. He became frustrated in 2006 and worked to use the internet to get around the traditional art scene.

In 2011, he did a residency at Anderson Ranch Arts Center, Snowmass, Colorado. He lived and worked in Coyoacan Mexico City with artist Rodrigo Cifuentes for 3 months in 2011.

His first solo show in Europe was at the Gallery Paulson in Copenhagen in May 2014. In November 2018, Aaron Johnson and Van Minnen had their first exhibit together in Hong Kong. Johnson and van Minnen have been long-time friends. Van Minnen works almost exclusively in painting but he has also made some ceramic sculptures.

Van Minnen is married to Ashley Muse, and they have a son.

== Influences ==
Van Minnen's favorite artist is Otto Marseus van Schrieck, a Dutch master painter, best known for his paintings of forest flora and fauna.

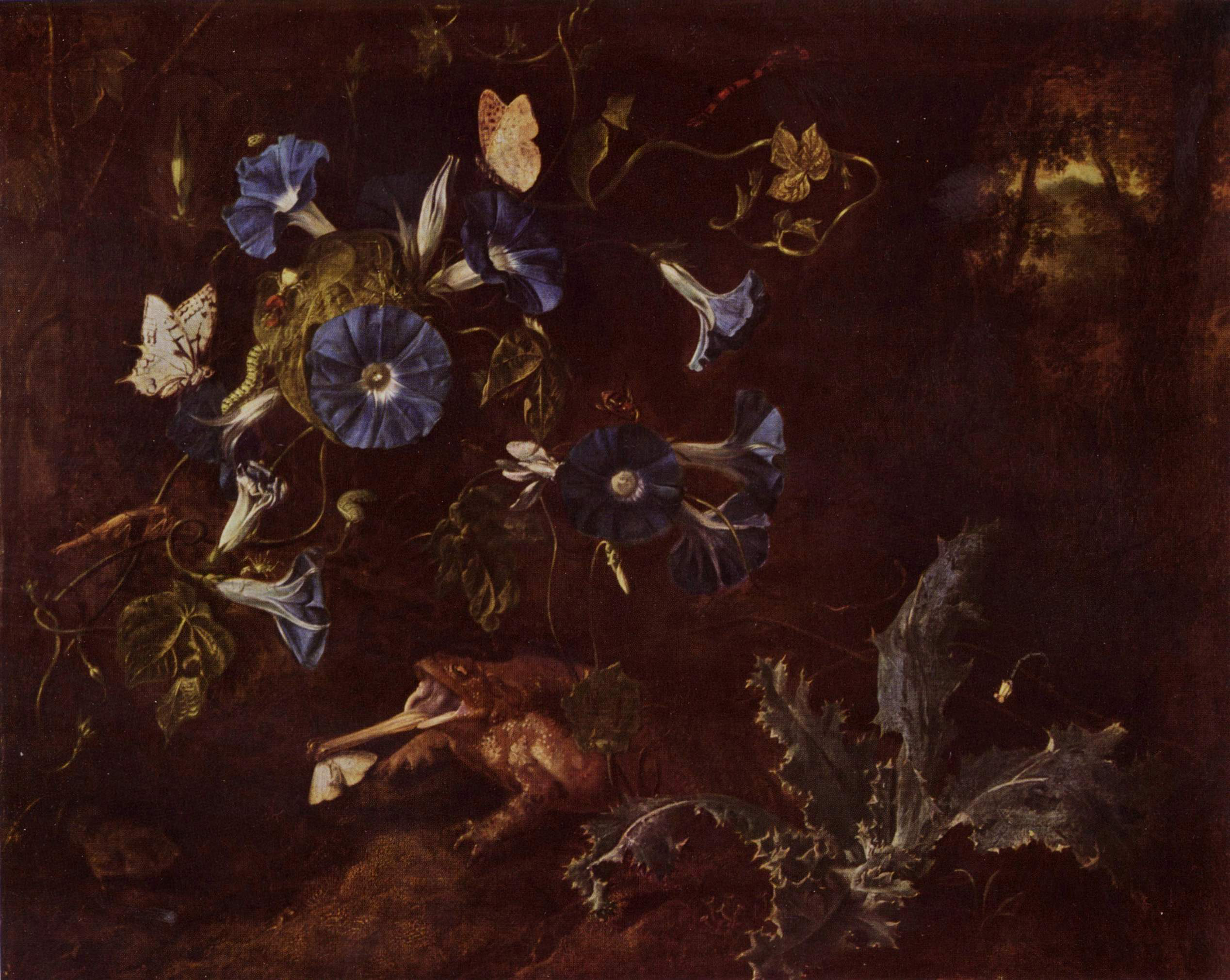
Otto Marseus van Schrieck painting

Van Minnen has studied the following artists: Nicole Duennebier, Ryan Riss, Judy Pfaff, Jenny Morgan, Barnaby Furnas, Skinner, Erik Parker, Judy Fox, Kenny Scharf, Ryan Schneider, Amir Fallah, Martin Wittfooth, Gregory Jacobsen, Sinisa Kukec, Liz Craft, Wayne White, Ryan Travis Christian, Seamus Conley, Fulvio di Piazza, Mark Dean Veca, Tomoe Gokita, Robin Williams, Barnaby Whitfield, Julie Heffernan, Nicola Verlato, David Altmejd, Robert Hardgrave, Kim Keever, Aaron Johnson, Brendan Danielsson, Wangechi Mutu, Pieter Bruegel the Elder and Pieter Aertsen.

Hendrik Goltzius and the line work from Grotius can be seen in some of the tattooed skins.

Influential authors have been John Steinbeck, Cormac McCarthy and the Mark Frost book, The Secret History of Twin Peaks Rembrandt and the old masters have also been a major influence. Much of his color mixing and painting go back to this technique.

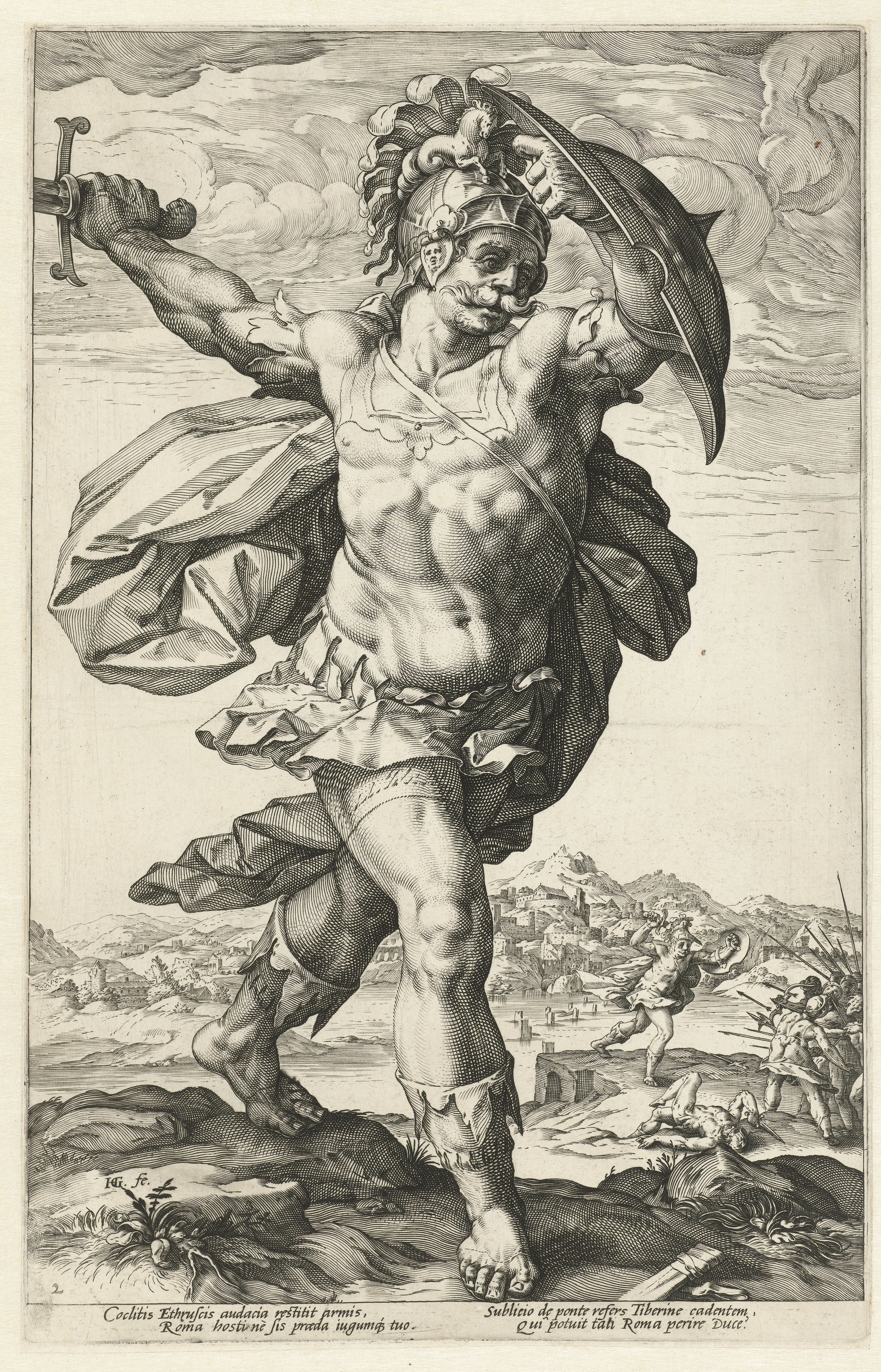
An influence on van Minnen for the tattoos and use of the "swelling line", where the burin is manipulated to make lines thicker or thinner to create a tonal effect from a distance

His colorful gummy bears go back to the Venetian school of mixing grays and colors along with complementary debt coloring. The gummy bears he paints are painted in reverse in that he paints the brightest colors first on a white oil background and then adds color on top. These gummy bears balance the heavy dark background. He enjoyed working in New York because of the environment, competitiveness, and pressure. New York to him, represents ideas but he had a chance to go back to Colorado each summer for mountain biking, fishing, and camping with his son. He has since gone to live in California to continue his surfing which comes through in his most recent paintings in painting tattoos of surfers on portraits.

While painting, he puts on audiobooks and podcasts in the background. What he plays depends on the state of mind of what he wants to paint. His listening tastes are very eclectic, from country, to classical opera to rap. He has a playlist that shuffles Anya and Ministry. His preference in podcasts is for comedy. Van Minnen is a hard worker who doesn't wait for inspiration to paint but shows up every day.

Film directors such as David Lynch (especially his 1990s series Twin Peaks). Werner Herzog and David Cronenberg have influenced van Minnen. But the greatest cinematic influence was the film series Alien especially Alien 2. Van Minnen saw this when he was young, and the character Ellen Ripley to him represents his mother trying to save the kids from the parasites of anger, addiction, and the environment. Van Minnen likes the early two movies more than the ones that came after them. One of the influences is a book he read when he was young was a nature field guide with drawings of parasites.

=== Painting style ===
He is interested in drawing the viewer into an attraction-repulsion feeding on the same part of the colors while the gummy bears draw the viewer in, and the organs and tattoos push the viewer away.

The production process involves a monochromatic underpainting while leaving the white of the canvas exposed for certain figures.

While his Dutch Masters golden age paintings might try to glorify that period it is clear to him that the rich materials in those paintings and the image themselves represent colonial exploitation. He starts with underpaintings and then overpaints with a semi-transparent color, as was developed by Titian. He uses a dynamic color mixing which allows them to paint in layers and allows the light to mix with the color instead of mixing on the palette. Self-taught, he studied intensively a book called Methods and Materials of the Great Schools and Masters by Sir Charles Lock Eastlake.

The underpaintings are monotypes, which he works on at home and continues painting at his studio. This allows a quick production of monotypes. He can get a couple done per week, allowing him to balance months of painting and layers that he applies on top. With this method, he is able to get ideas out quickly and not worry about capturing every idea and painting in the first pass.

Van Minnen does not describe his work as macabre which would have to do with death and injury but rather about life and the absurd. His work has also been called Super-Realism because his figures and gummy bears leap off the canvas. Another series features severed heads on top of jelly bears.

Van Minnen has also been compared to a modern Arcimboldo or a cross between a Natural history museum and H.R. Giger

In 2014 Van Minnen added more color to his work.

In 2017, while wandering Madrid Van Minnen picked up a watercolor kit and has been making a number of pieces when traveling and outside of the studio.

In 2017 he started working on a series with real-world issues and social political images. He does not want to go back to previous styles and continues to innovate.

=== Elements in the portraits ===
The characters or people in van Minnen's portraits are not specific people but objects on which his elements are placed on top in an automatic manner. None of the elements are metaphors or symbols. His paintings are not puzzles to be decoded and broken down and analyzed.

His elements repeat through his work starting from the earlier still life.

- Circles with spirals and bead-like structures are used like repetitive words that lose their meaning with the repetition.
- Tattoos on figures sometimes are not easy to read and they do not have a private meaning to Van Minnen.

"With my phone in one hand and brushes in the other I go “live” on Instagram and begin “tattooing” the live feed comments into an oil-wet flesh glaze as quickly as I can. I tattoo the comments as they come in, it’s indiscriminate and creates a very permanent registration of things that are most ephemeral, these comments that otherwise have no permanent archive."

- Lack of eyes or mouths on the figures might make it easier for the viewer to look longer at the piece.
- Tie-dyed colors in a portrait.

== Permanent collections ==
- Denver Art Museum
- Djurhuus Collection
- Colecciōn Solo
- Richard B. Sachs Collection

== Exhibitions ==
=== Solo exhibitions ===
2017

- Mourning Wood in Liminal Dawn, Richard Heller Gallery, Santa Monica, CA

2016

- Enantiodromia, Gallery Poulsen, Copenhagen, Denmark

This was the first time that van Minnen exhibited ceramic sculptures. Enantiodromia is an ancient Greek theory that says that any large force in one direction will actually produce the opposite force.

2018

- Once in a time in America, Copenhagen, Denmark

2015

- Golden Memes, Robischon Gallery, Denver, CO

2014

- Glazed and Confused, Gallery Poulsen, Copenhagen, Denmark

2013

- Welsh Rats, Robischon Gallery, Denver, CO

"Welsh Rats", is a play on words for a German word ‘Weltschmerz’ coming from John Steinbeck in East of Eden. In German this means "world pain". Van Minnen is expressing that Americans contort the meanings of older heavy European expressions. Several dark still lives were first presented at this exhibit such as Bad Vibes.

2012

- Fever Dream, Copro Gallery, Los Angeles, CA

2011

- Rainbow Blight, Bert Green Fine Art, Los Angeles, CA

2010

- Neo-Grotesque, Roq la Rue Gallery, Seattle, WA

== Radio, television, and film ==
- 2015 Featured in @Large: Creators at Work TV Documentary Series, Redbull Production Studios, NYC
