= Mona Morales-Schildt =

Swedish glass artist (1908–1999)

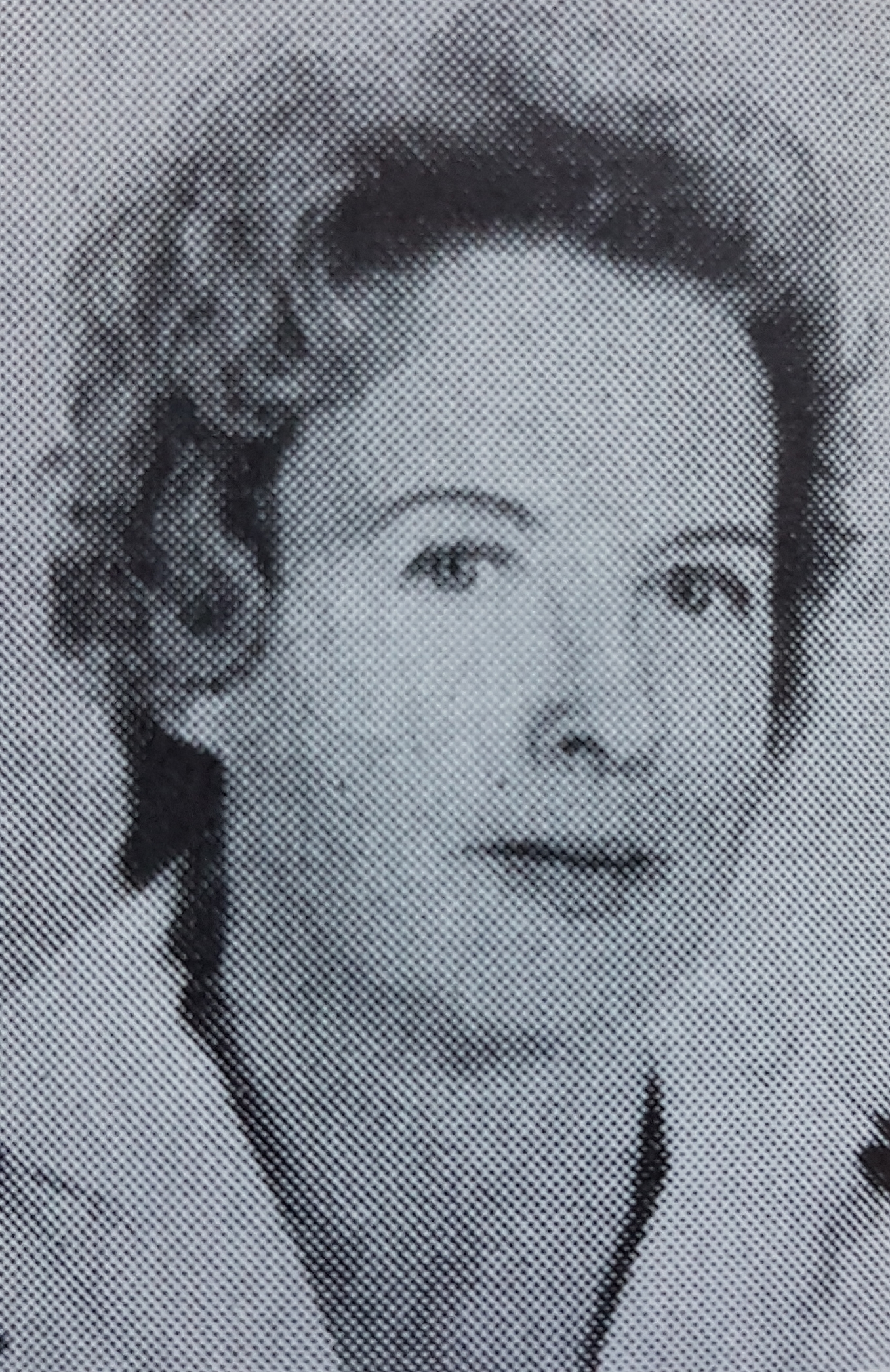
- Died: 23 February 1999
- Employer: Gustavsberg porcelain (1934–1938)
- Spouse(s): Göran Schildt
- Parent(s): Olallo Morales

Monica (Mona) Ulrika Morales-Schildt (March 1, 1908 – February 23, 1999) was a Swedish designer and glass artist, best known for her Ventana series of vases. Morales-Schildt's works are held by various museums in Sweden and internationally.

== Biography ==
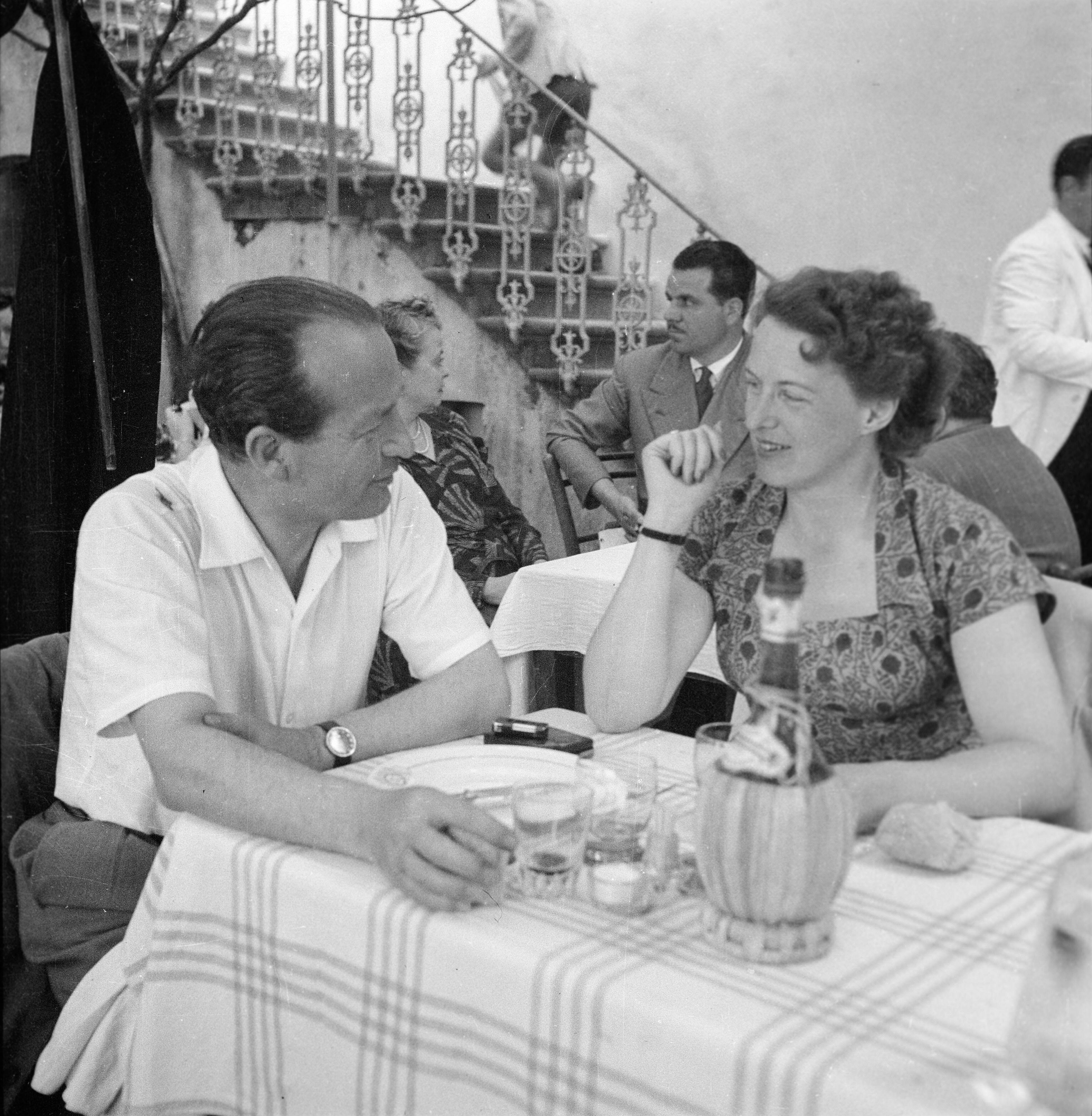
Mona Morales-Schildt with Paolo Venini (Göran Schildt photo)

Mona Morales-Schildt was the daughter of Olallo Morales and Clary Morales, and sister of Christer Morales. She studied at the Higher Art and Crafts School in Stockholm (Swedish: Högre Konstindustriella Skolan, a predecessor to the University of Arts, Crafts, and Design). In 1936 she pursued further studies at poster artist Paul Colin's advertising and painting school in Paris. She worked for Gustavsberg porcelain (1934–1938), where she was an assistant to Wilhelm Kåge. She then worked for the ceramics company Arabia (1938–1939), and for the department store Nordiska Kompaniet (NK, 1945–1957). In 1950 Morales-Schildt and her husband visited the Venetian glass artist Paolo Venini in Murano to arrange an exhibition of his work at NK. From 1958 to 1971 she worked for Kosta glassworks, where she was the second woman artist to work at the firm, after Tyra Lundgren.

She is best known for her Ventana series (Spanish: Windows), heavy glass pieces with enclosed layers of pigment. Morales-Schildt began the Ventana series in 1959, and was inspired by Venini.

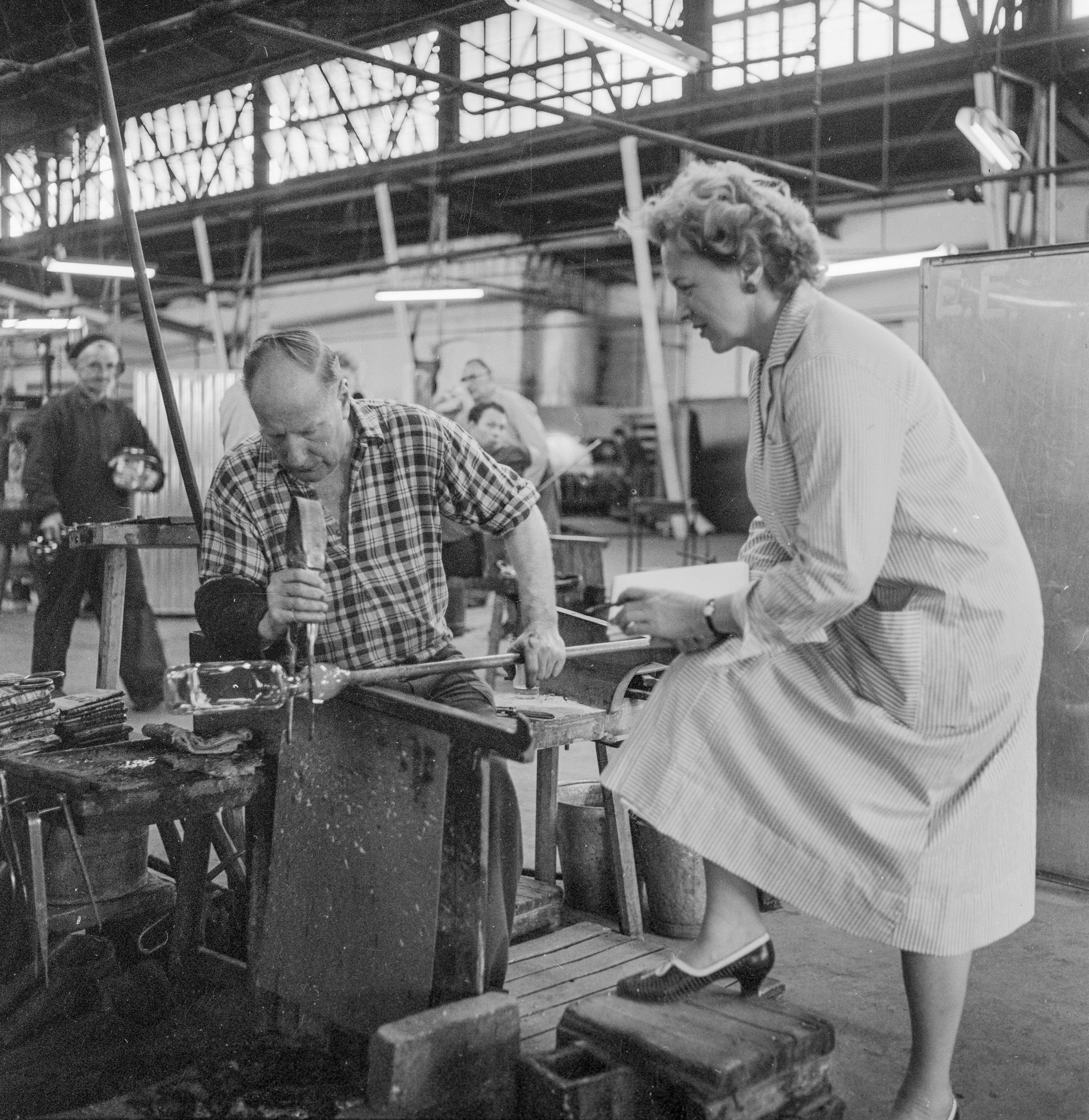
Mona Morales-Schildt at Kosta glassworks (Göran Schildt photo)

Her work is held in the collections of the Nationalmuseum in Stockholm, the Smålands museum, and Örebro läns museum, as well as the American Swedish Institute in Minnesota, and the Baltimore Museum of Art in Maryland.

== Gallery of works ==
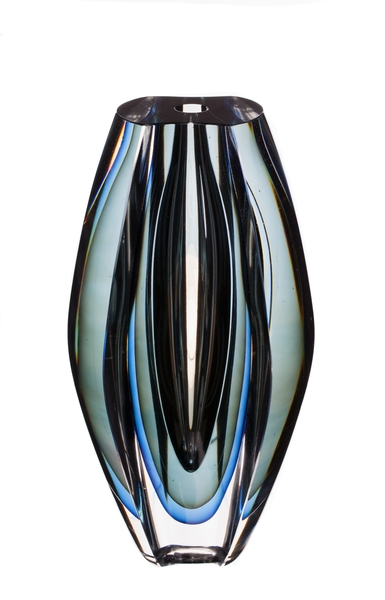
Ventana vase, Smålands museum collection

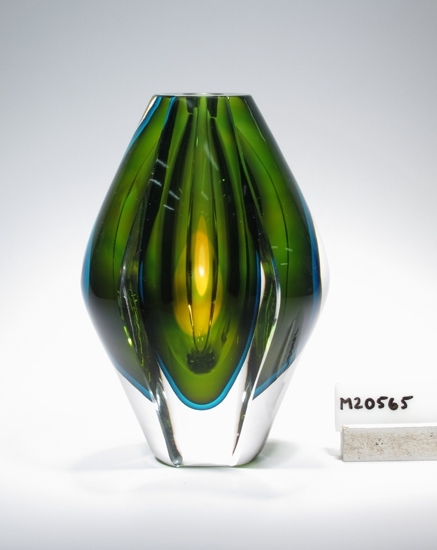
Ventana vase, Smålands museum collection

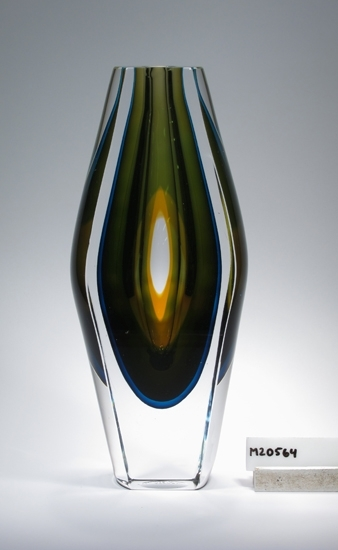
Ventana vase, Smålands museum collection

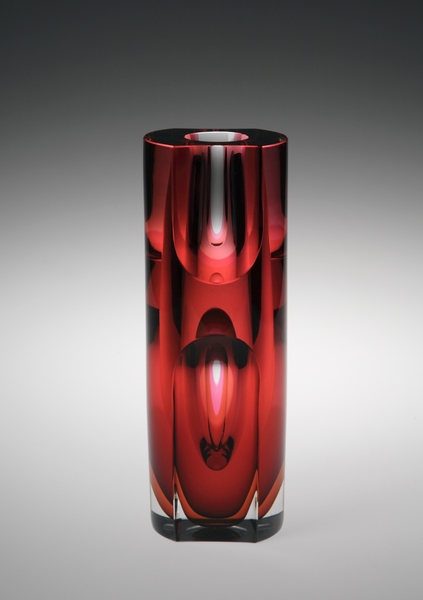
Red glass vase, Smålands museum collection

== Personal life ==
Mona Morales-Schildt was married to the Finnish writer and art historian Göran Schildt from 1941–1964.
