= Jesse Edwards =

Jesse Edwards may refer to:

- Jesse Edwards (artist) (born 1977), American fine art oil painter, graffiti artist, and ceramicist
- Jesse Edwards (baseball), Negro league baseball player
- Jesse Edwards (basketball) (born 2000), Dutch basketball player
- Jesse Edwards (businessman) (1849–1924), businessman and founder of Newberg, Oregon

== See also ==
- Jess Edwards, full name Jesse Craton Edwards Jr., American politician
