= Lundgren =

Swedish surname

- Pronunciation: Swedish pronunciation: [/²lɵn(d)ɡreːn/]
- Language: Swedish

Origin
- Language: North Germanic
- Meaning: grove branch
- Region of origin: Sweden

Other names
- Variant forms: Lundgreen, Lundgrenn, Lungren, Lundhgren

Lundgren, and the variant spellings Lundgreen, Lundgrenn and Lungren, are Swedish ornamental surnames composed of the elements lund ('grove') and gren ('branch'). Notable people with the surname include:

== Lundgren ==
- Adam Lundgren (born 1986), Swedish actor
- Anders Lundgren (1898–1964), Norwegian sailor
- Andrea Lundgren (born 1986), Swedish writer
- Arnold Lundgren (1899–1979), Danish cyclist
- Bo Lundgren (born 1947), Swedish politician
- Bruce Lundgren (1931–2003), Australian rules footballer
- Carl A. Lundgren, subject of Ex parte Lundgren
- Carl Lundgren (1880–1934), American athlete and coach
- Carl Lundgren (illustrator) (born 1947), American artist and illustrator
- Charles Lundgren, American curler
- David Lundgren, American politician
- Del Lundgren (1899–1984), American baseball player
- Dolph Lundgren (born 1957), Swedish and American actor and martial artist
- Egron Lundgren (1815–1875), Swedish painter and author
- Elin Lundgren (born 1978), Swedish politician
- Eric Lundgren, American businessperson
- Ester Ringnér-Lundgren (1907–1993), Swedish writer
- Eva Lundgren (born 1947), Norwegian-Swedish sociologist
- Eva-Lena Lundgren (born 1961), Swedish beauty pageant contestant
- Fredrik Lundgren (born 1979), Swedish footballer
- Gillis Lundgren (1929–2016), Swedish designer
- Greg Lundgren (born 1969), American artist
- Gunilla Lundgren (born 1942), Swedish writer
- Gustav Lundgren (footballer) (born 1995), Swedish footballer
- Gustav Lundgren (musician) (born 1980), Swedish jazz guitarist
- Harriet Lundgren (1907–1996), Chicago Civic Opera prima ballerina
- Holger Lundgren (1912–1966), Swedish Nordic combined skier
- Jan Lundgren (born 1966), Swedish jazz pianist and composer
- Jeffrey Lundgren (1950–2006), American cult leader and mass murderer
- Johan Lundgren (businessman) (born 1966), Swedish businessman
- John Lundgren (baritone) (born 1968), Swedish opera singer
- John Lundgren (cyclist) (1940–2024), Danish cyclist
- John F. Lundgren (born 1951), American businessman
- Jörgen Lundgren (born 1969), Swedish footballer
- Karin Lundgren (athlete) (born 1944), Swedish sprinter
- Karin Lundgren (swimmer) (1895–1977), Swedish swimmer
- Kent T. Lundgren (1914–1986), American pharmacist and politician
- Kerstin Lundgren (born 1955), Swedish politician
- Lotta Lundgren (born 1971), Swedish television host and food writer
- Louis Lundgren (1901–1976), Danish sprinter
- Magnus Lundgren (born 1964), Swedish sailor
- Maill Lundgren (born 2001), Swedish footballer
- Maja Lundgren (born 1965), Swedish writer
- Malin Lundgren (born 1967), Swedish footballer
- Marguerite Lundgren (1916–1983), British/Swedish eurythmist and anthroposophist
- Max Lundgren (1937–2005), Swedish children's writer
- Moa Lundgren (born 1998), Swedish cross-country skier
- Niclas Lundgren (born 1989), Swedish ice hockey player
- Nils Lundgren (born 1936), Swedish politician and economist
- P. A. Lundgren (1911–2002), Swedish art director
- Parker Lundgren (born 1986), American guitarist
- Peter Lundgren (1965–2024), Swedish tennis player and coach
- Peter Lundgren (politician) (born 1963), Swedish politician
- Phil Lundgren (1940–2015), British boxer
- Shane Lundgren (born 1961), American aviator and businessman
- Shannon Lundgren (born 1972), American politician
- Sofia Lundgren (born 1982), Swedish footballer
- Sven Lundgren (1896–1960), Swedish middle-distance runner
- Sven Lundgren (decathlete) (1901–1982), Swedish decathlete
- Sven-Olof Lundgren (1908–1946), Swedish ski jumper
- Terry Lundgren (born 1952), American business executive
- Thomas Lundgren (born 1956), Swedish ski jumper
- Thomas S. Lundgren (born 1935), American fluid dynamicist
- Tyra Lundgren (1897–1979), Swedish artist, designer, and writer
- Valter Lundgren (1917–1997), Swedish footballer
- Wayne Lundgren (born 1982), Australian professional baseball pitcher

== Lundgreen ==
- Cecilie Lundgreen (born 1973), Norwegian professional golfer
- Christoph Lundgreen (born 1980), German historian of classical antiquity
- Helge Lundgreen (1815–1892), German historian
- Nikoline Lundgreen (born 1998), Danish handball player
- Peter Lundgreen (1936–2015), German historian
- Siff Lundgreen (born 1993), Danish actress and screenwriter
- Trygve Lundgreen (1888–1947), Norwegian speed skater

== Lundgrenn ==
- Bjørn Egil Lundgrenn (born 1970), Norwegian speed skater

== Lungren ==
- Dan Lungren (born 1946), American lawyer & politician
- Fernand Lungren (1857–1932), American painter

== Fictional characters ==
- Brooke Lundgren, a character in the Grey Griffins book series
- George Lundgren, a character in the Arthur TV series
- Lundgren, a major antagonist in Fire Emblem: The Blazing Blade

== See also ==
- Lundrigan
