= Paolo Venini =

Murano glass entrepreneur (1895–1959)

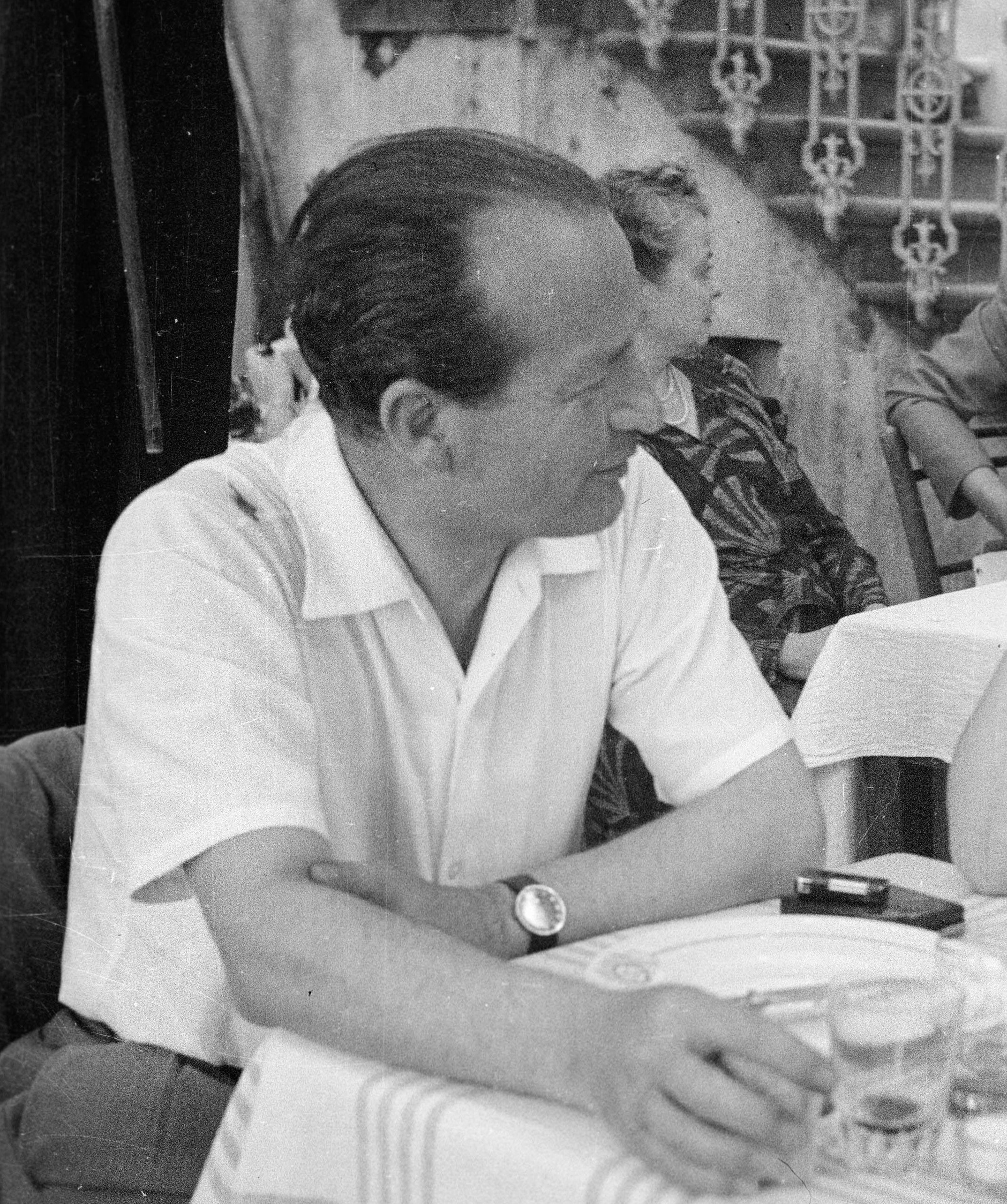
Paolo Venini by Göran Schildt

Paolo Venini (12 January 1895– 22 July 1959) emerged as one of the leading figures in the production of Murano glass and an important contributor to twentieth century Italian design. He is known for having founded the eponymous Venini & C. glassworks.

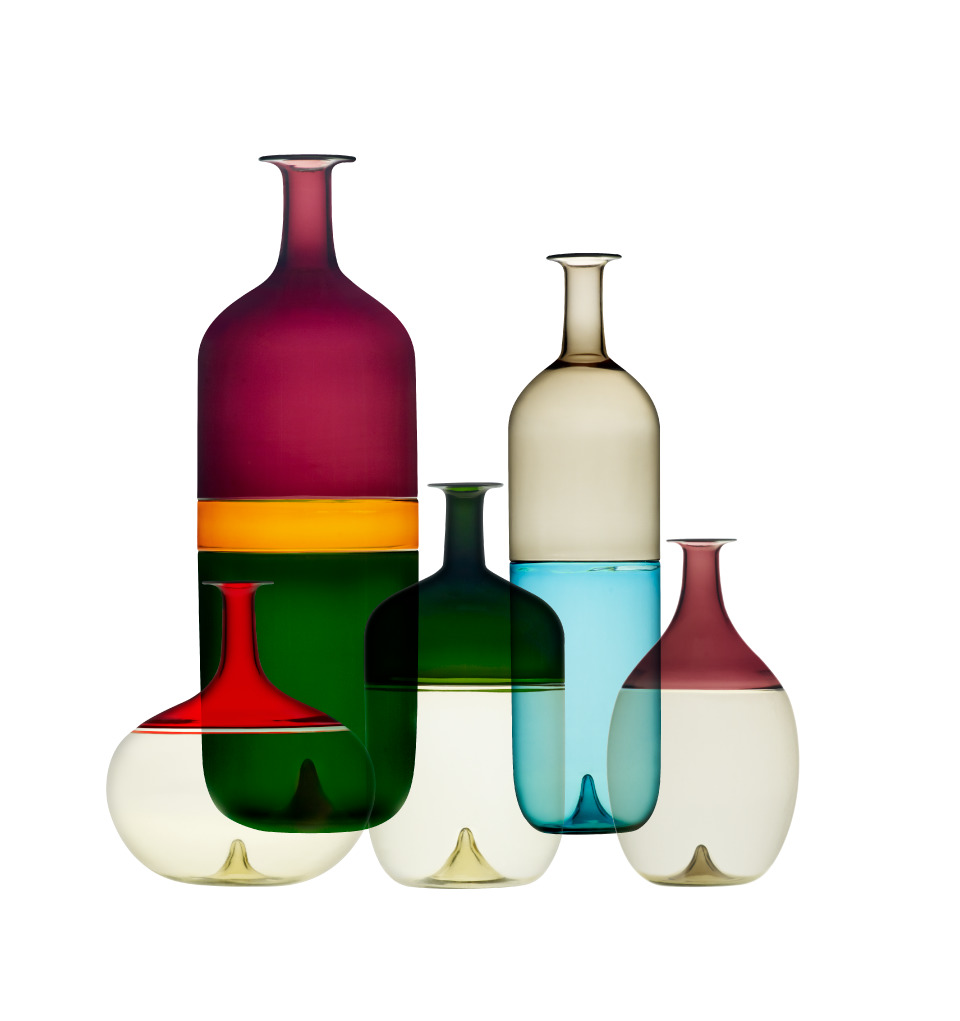
Tapio Wirkkala bottles (1966)

== Early life and education ==
Venini was born in the town of Cusano near Milan, Italy. After serving in the Royal Italian Army in World War I, he trained as a lawyer and began his practice in Milan. He soon developed an acquaintance with Giacomo Cappellin, a native of Venice who owned a Milan antiques shop.

== Murano glassworks ==
In 1921 Venini and Cappellin opened a glass factory called Vetri Soffiati Muranesi Cappellin Venini & C. on the islands of Murano, the historic glass production centre in the lagoon of Venice, Italy. With Luigi Ceresa and Emilio Hochs as investors, they arranged to purchase the recently closed Murano glass factory of Andrea Rioda, hire the former firm's glassblowers, and retain Rioda himself to serve as technical director of the venture.

Their plans went quickly awry, however, when Rioda died before production had begun. Several of the principal glassblowers decamped to found a competitor firm under the name Successori Andrea Rioda. Nonetheless, the venture was successfully launched and prospered with support from the founders' distribution contacts in Milan. The firm also benefited from a commitment to introducing new, modern design concepts.

Following disputes between the founders, Cappellin withdrew from the firm in 1925 and opened a competing business, which hired most of Venini's master glassblowers. Venini reorganized with new glassblowers, first as Vetro Soffiati Muranesi Venini & C. (V.S.M. Venini & C.), and later simply Venini & C., ultimately becoming one of the most well known Murano glassworks.

The company entrusted the creative direction to Murano sculptor Napoleone Martinuzzi, although Paolo Venini himself played a role in designing several of the company's best-known products, including the "Fazzoletto" (handkerchief) series, which he created with designer Fulvio Bianconi. Venini embarked on collaborations with architects and designers such as Cini Boeri, Tomaso Buzzi, Gio Ponti, Carlo Scarpa, Ettore Sottsass, Alessandro Mendini, Tapio Wirkkala, Gae Aulenti, Tyra Lundgren, Mona Morales-Schildt, and Massimo Vignelli (who would also go on to design the company's new graphic identity and logo in 1982). The ethos was to "take the Murano tradition of glass blowing and combine it with the French fashion industry's tradition of using designers." The practice of working with notable designers has continued and includes more recent collaborations with Tadao Ando, Asymptote, Barber & Osgerby, the Campana brothers, and Peter Marino.

Following Venini's death in 1959, the company continued for over twenty years under the management of other family members and was then sold in 1985.

In 1997 Società Venini S.p.A. was acquired by Royal Scandinavia group.

In 2001, the company was sold to Italian Luxury Industries Group, and subsequently acquired by Damiani S.p.A. in 2016.

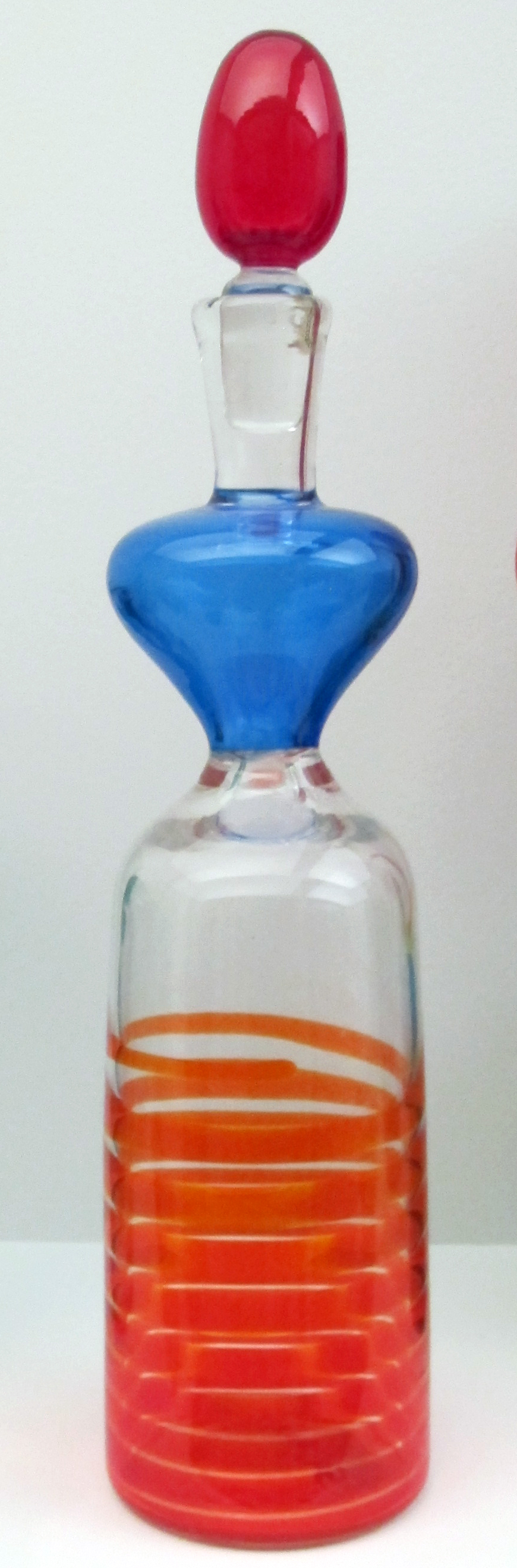
Giò ponti bottle with top (c.1949)

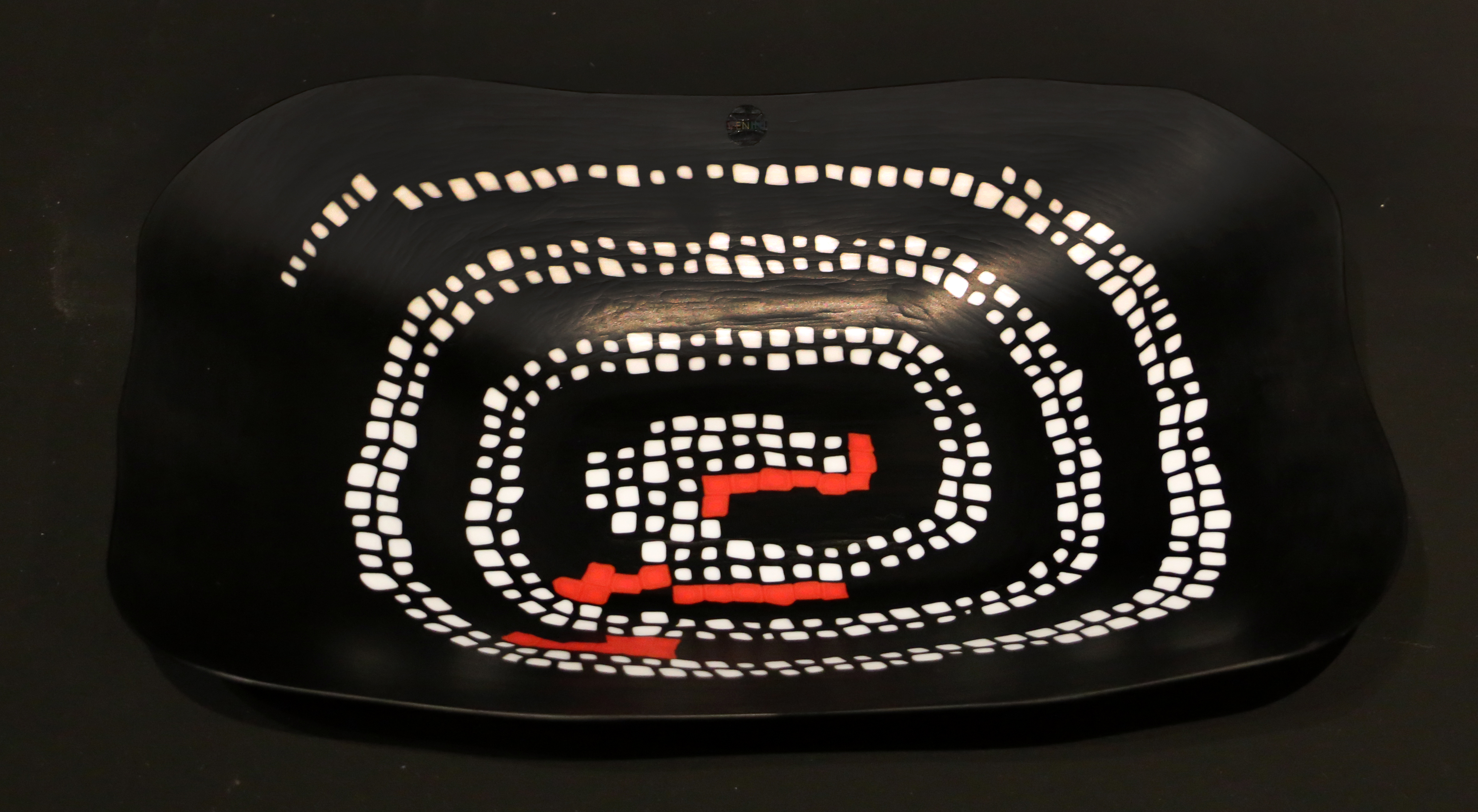
Carlo Scarpa "Serpente" plate (1940)

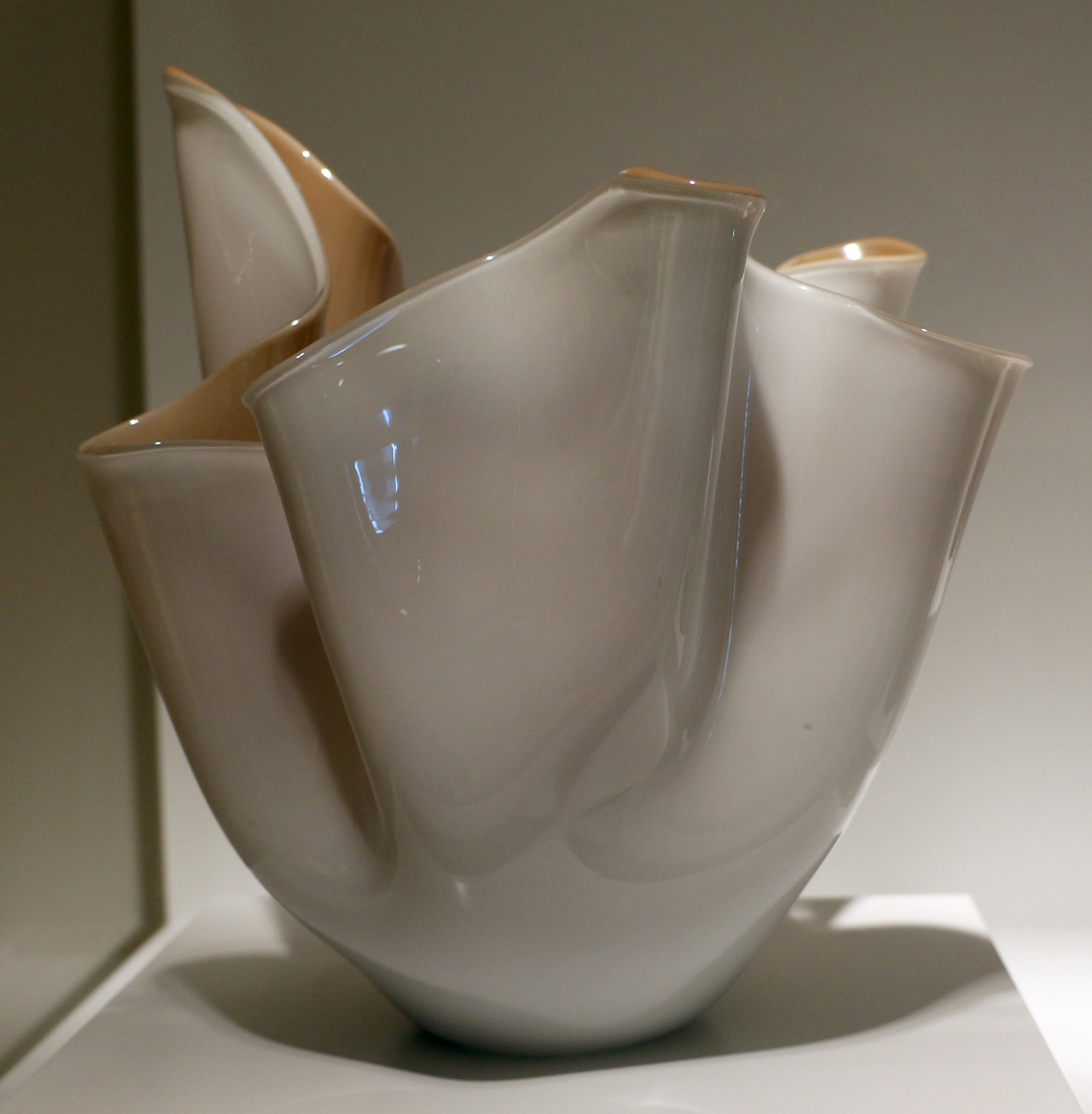
Paolo venini and Fulvio Bianconi "Handkerchief" vase (c.1948)

== Exhibitions ==
On the occasion of the opening of the newly founded Frauenau Glass Museum on 6 May 1975, the museum presented a special exhibition Venini-Murano with works from the Wolfgang Kermer collection for the first time in Germany.

In 2002 the Fondation Cartier pour l’Art Contemporain staged an exhibition called “Fragilisme di Alessandro Mendini” the centrepiece of which was a Venini glass sculpture titled "Guerrier de Verre".

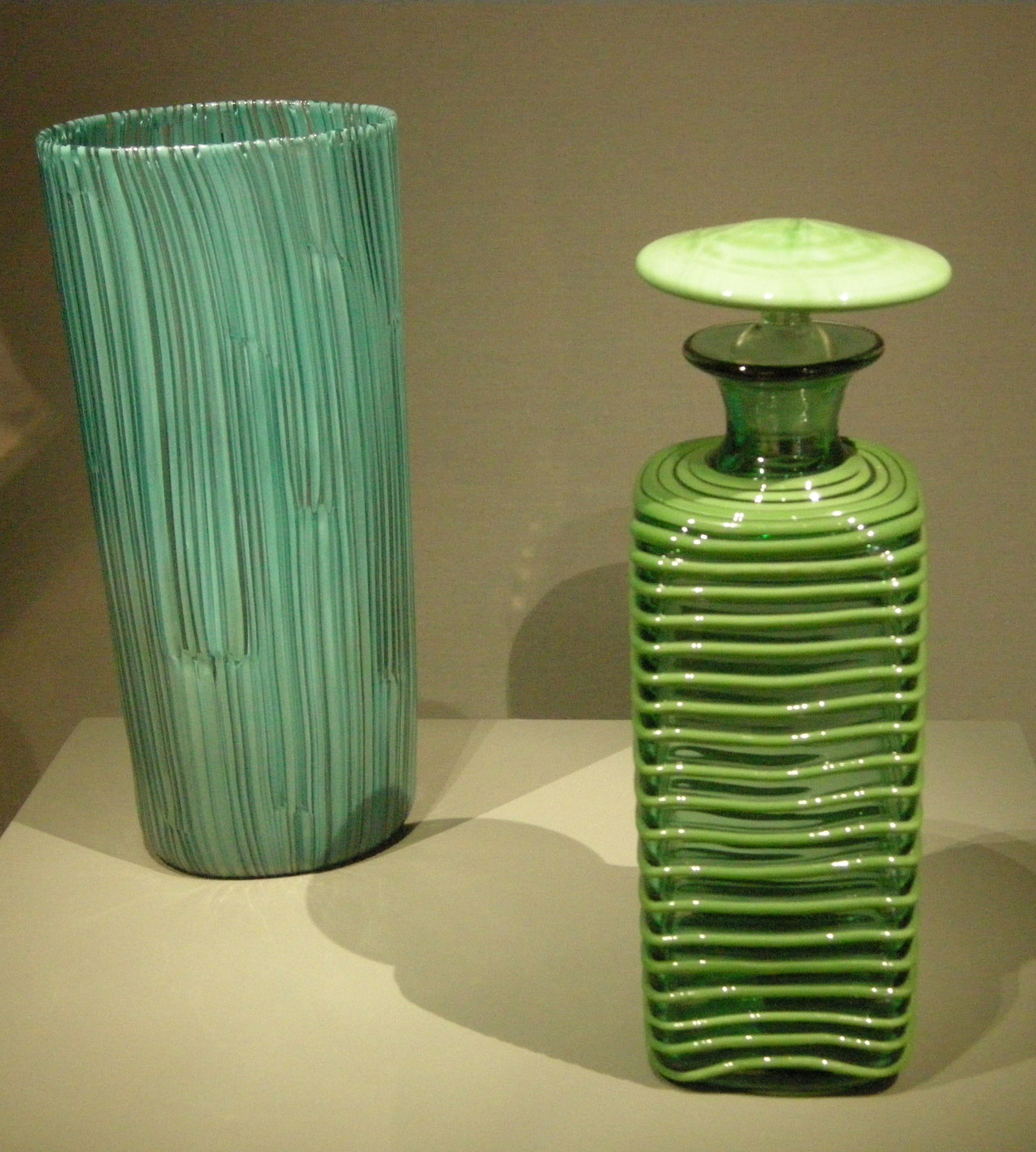
Vase and decanter

== Publications ==
- Carl I. Gable, Murano Magic: Complete Guide to Venetian Glass, its History and Artists (Schiffer, 2004), pp. 76–79, 232–234. ISBN 0-7643-1946-9.
- Anna Venini Diaz de Santillana, Venini: Catalogue Raisonné 1921–1986 (Skira, 2000). ISBN 88-8118-651-9.
- Deboni, Franco (2007). Venini glass. Pierre Rosenberg. Turin: Umberto Allemandi. ISBN 978-88-422-1524-0. OCLC 163580797.
- Venini, Paolo (2016). Paolo Venini and his furnace. Paolo Venini, Marino Barovier, Carla Sonego, Stanze del vetro (1 ed.). Milano. ISBN 978-88-572-3354-3. OCLC 959935997.
