= Museum of Museums =

Contemporary art center, Seattle, WA, US (founded 2019)

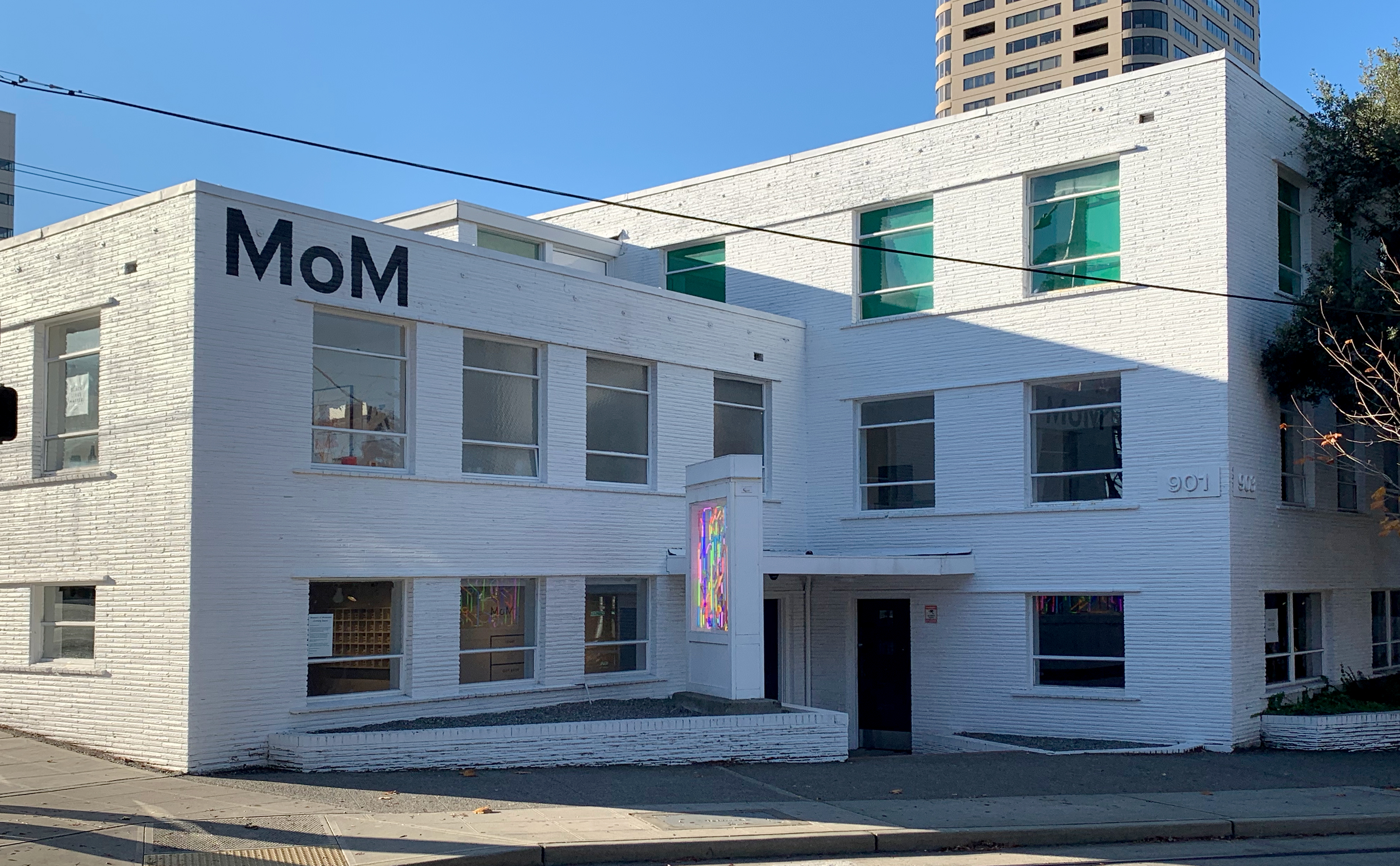
- Established: 2019
- Dissolved: 2023
- Location: Seattle, Washington, United States
- Type: Art museum
- Founder: Greg Lundgren
- Website: museumofmuseums.com

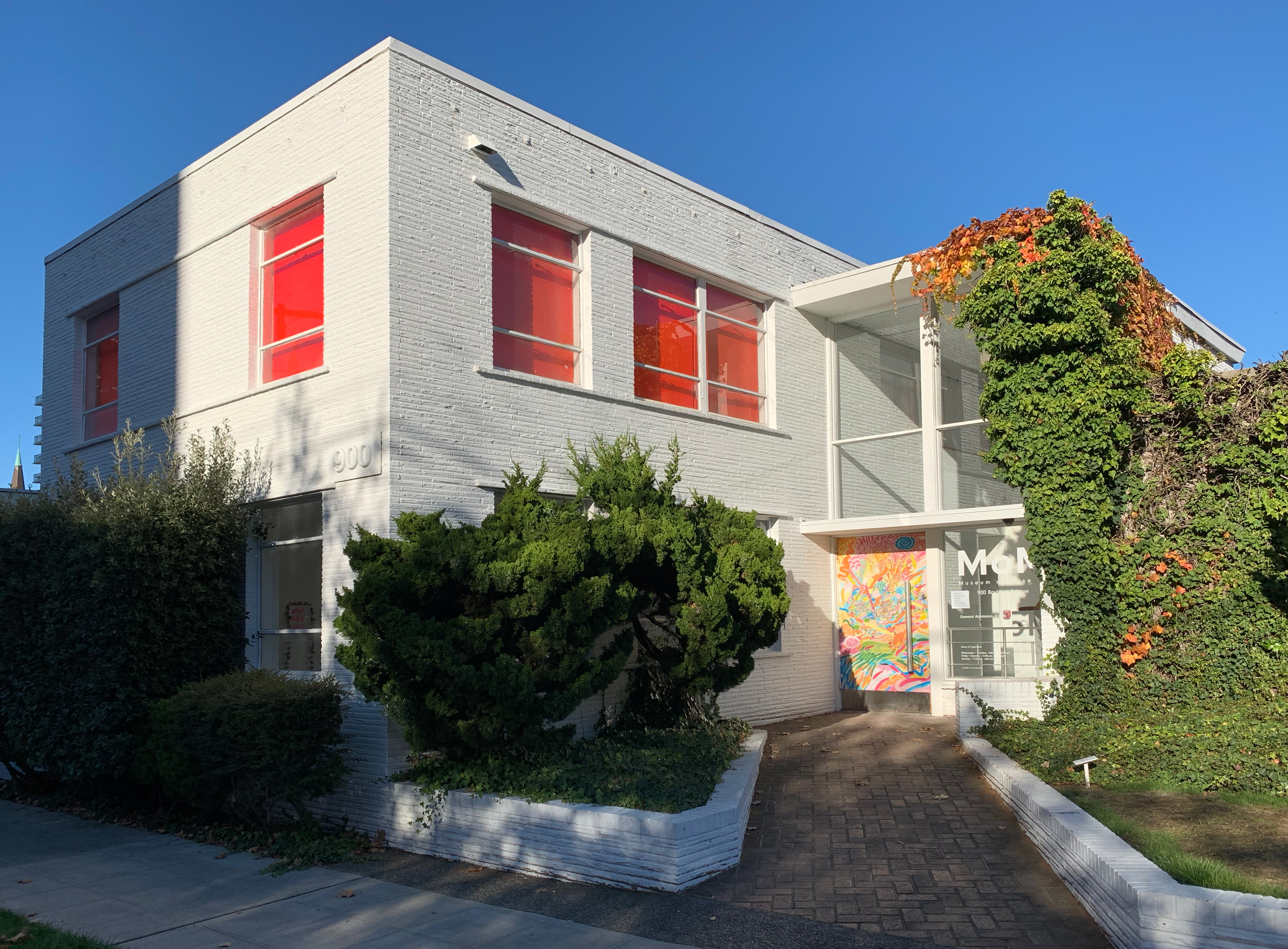
Museum of Museums as viewed from Boylston Avenue

The Museum of Museums (MoM) was a contemporary art center in Seattle, Washington, United States, that was created and managed by curator, artist, and entrepreneur Greg Lundgren.

MoM was contained within a three-story mid-century medical building, designed by NBBJ, on the Swedish Medical Center campus on First Hill. It previously was used for medical offices and records storage, among other businesses. Lundgren made an agreement with Swedish Health Services in 2019 to renovate the building, unused since c. 2012, as an art museum. The museum's final day of operation was September 1, 2023, due to plumbing issues in the building. There are no currently known plans for demolition or other use of the building.

MoM had 8,000 square feet (740 m^{2}) of space hosting two formal exhibition spaces, two additional on-site museums, rotating installations, murals and sculpture, a theater, weekly art classes, pop-ups, and a conceptual gift shop.
