= Villa Skeppet =

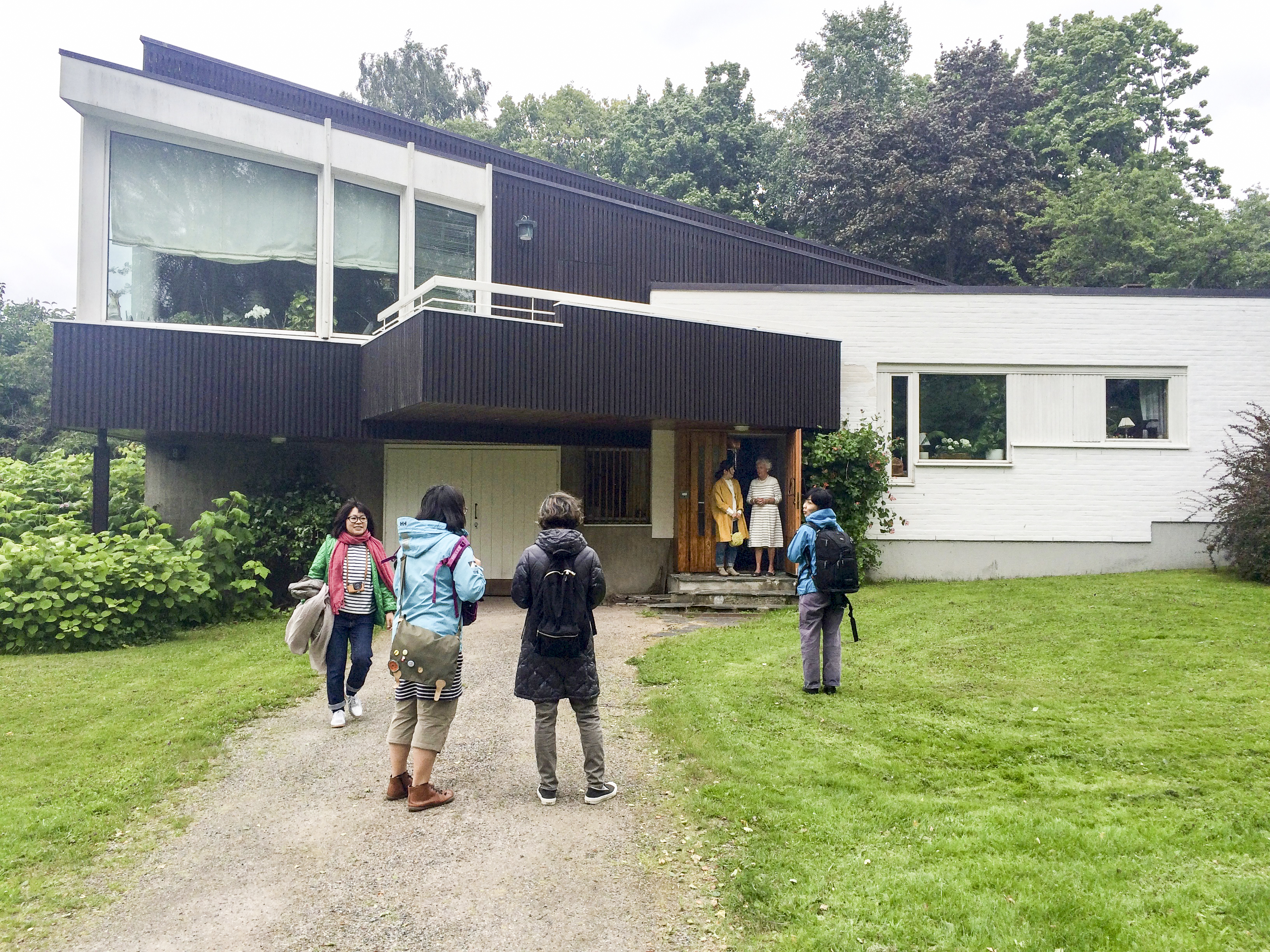
- Interactive map of the Villa Skeppet area

General information
- Location: 59.970076°N 23.436718°E
- Completed: 1970

Design and construction
- Architect: Alvar Alto

Website
- villaskeppet.fi/en/

Villa Skeppet is a home designed by the Finnish modernist architect Alvar Aalto for his friends Christine and Göran Schildt in Ekenäs, Finland. The building was constructed in 1969–1970 and was the last as well as the smallest home he designed.

Today Villa Skeppet is owned by The Christine and Göran Schildt Foundation. The building was opened for the general public in December 2020.

== Pictures ==
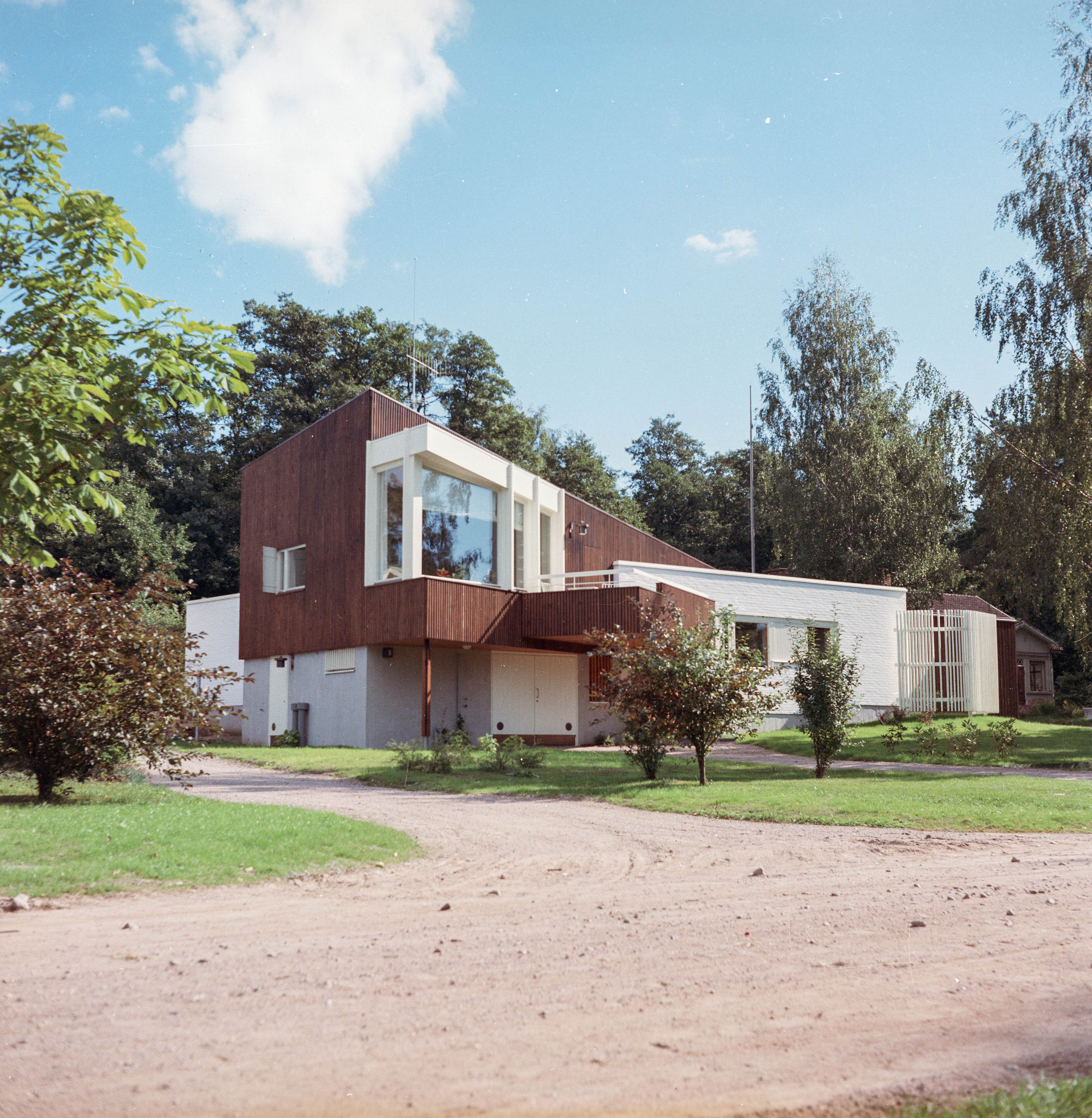
Front

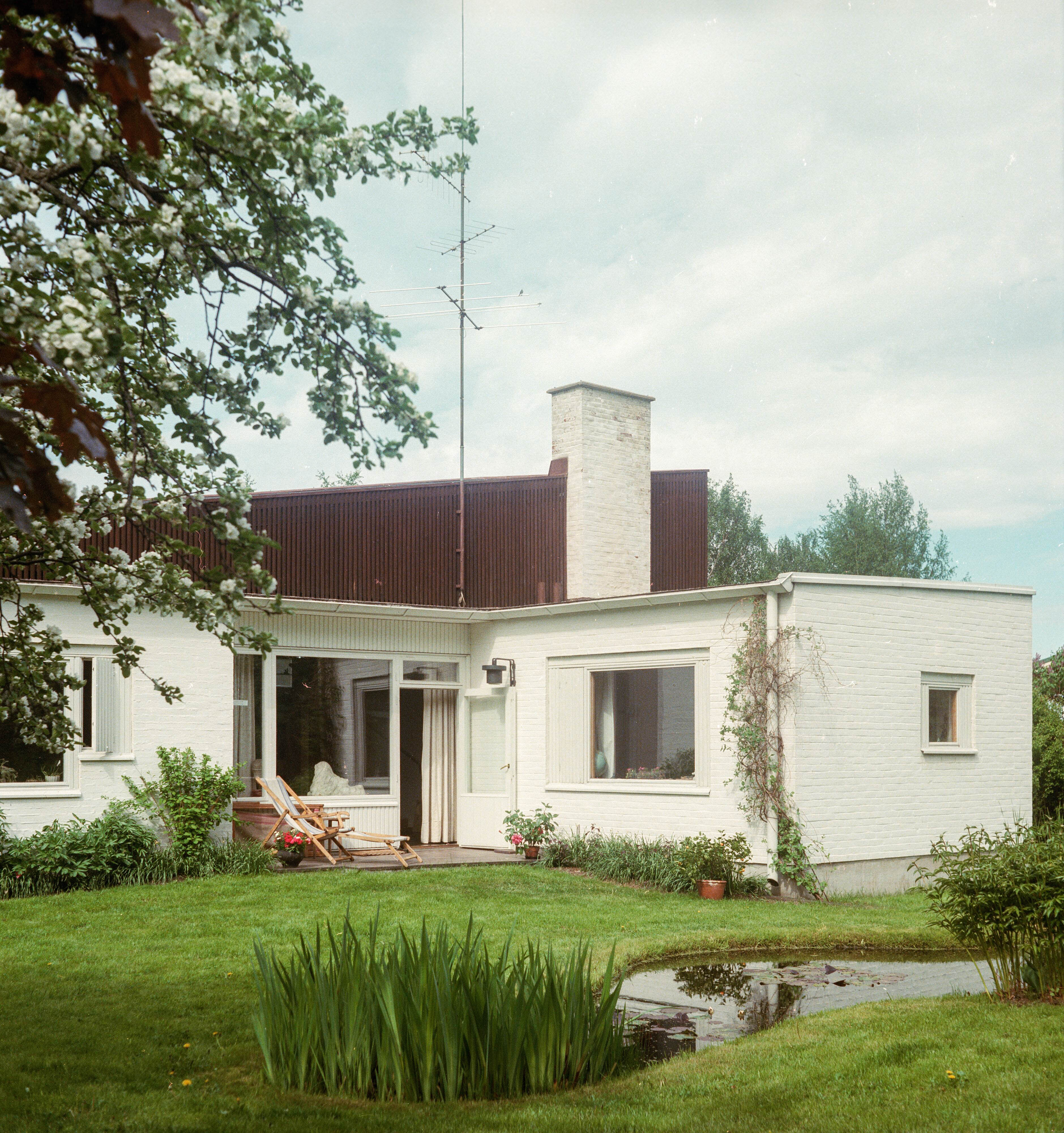
Back

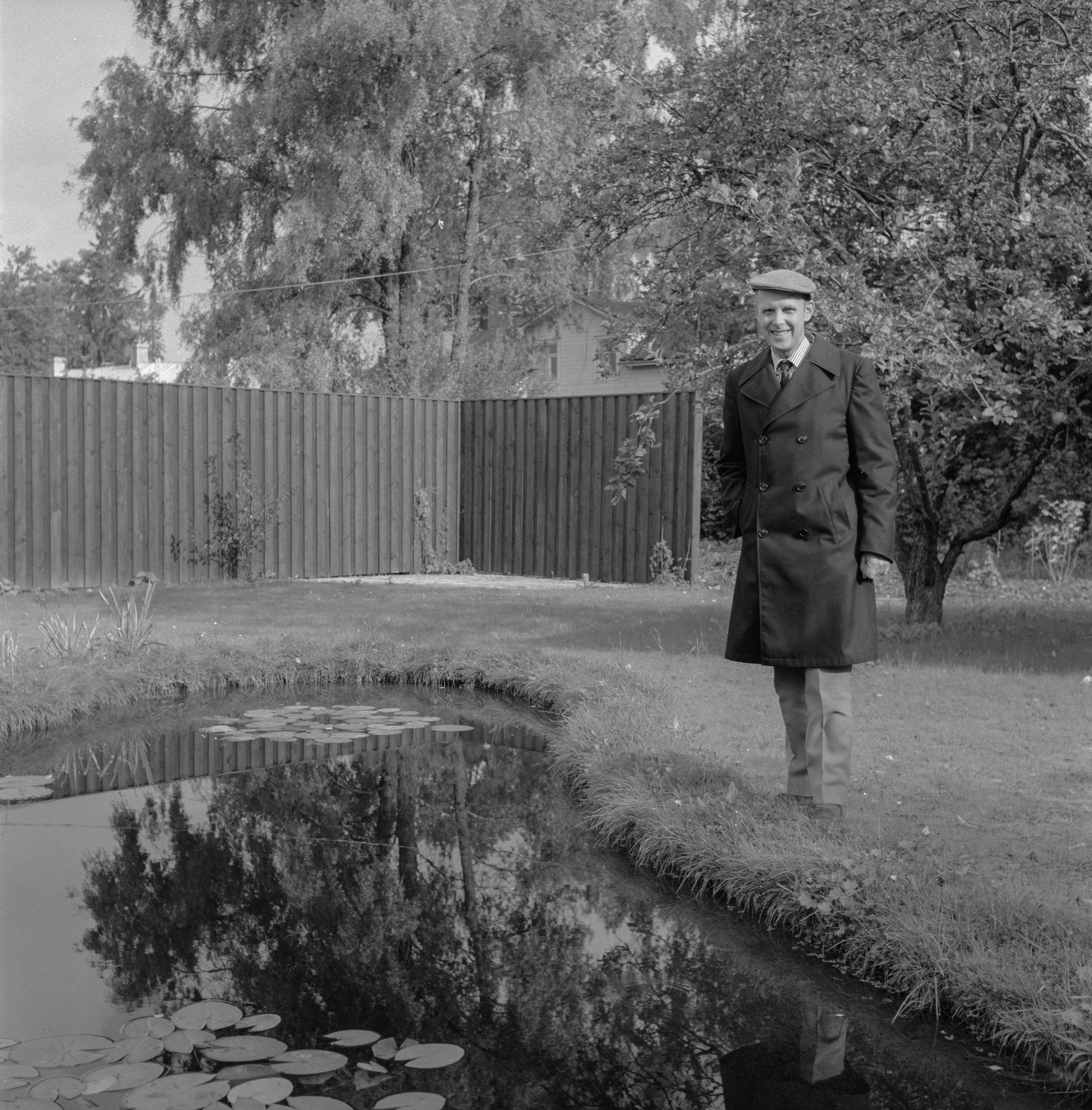
Back yard and Göran Schildt

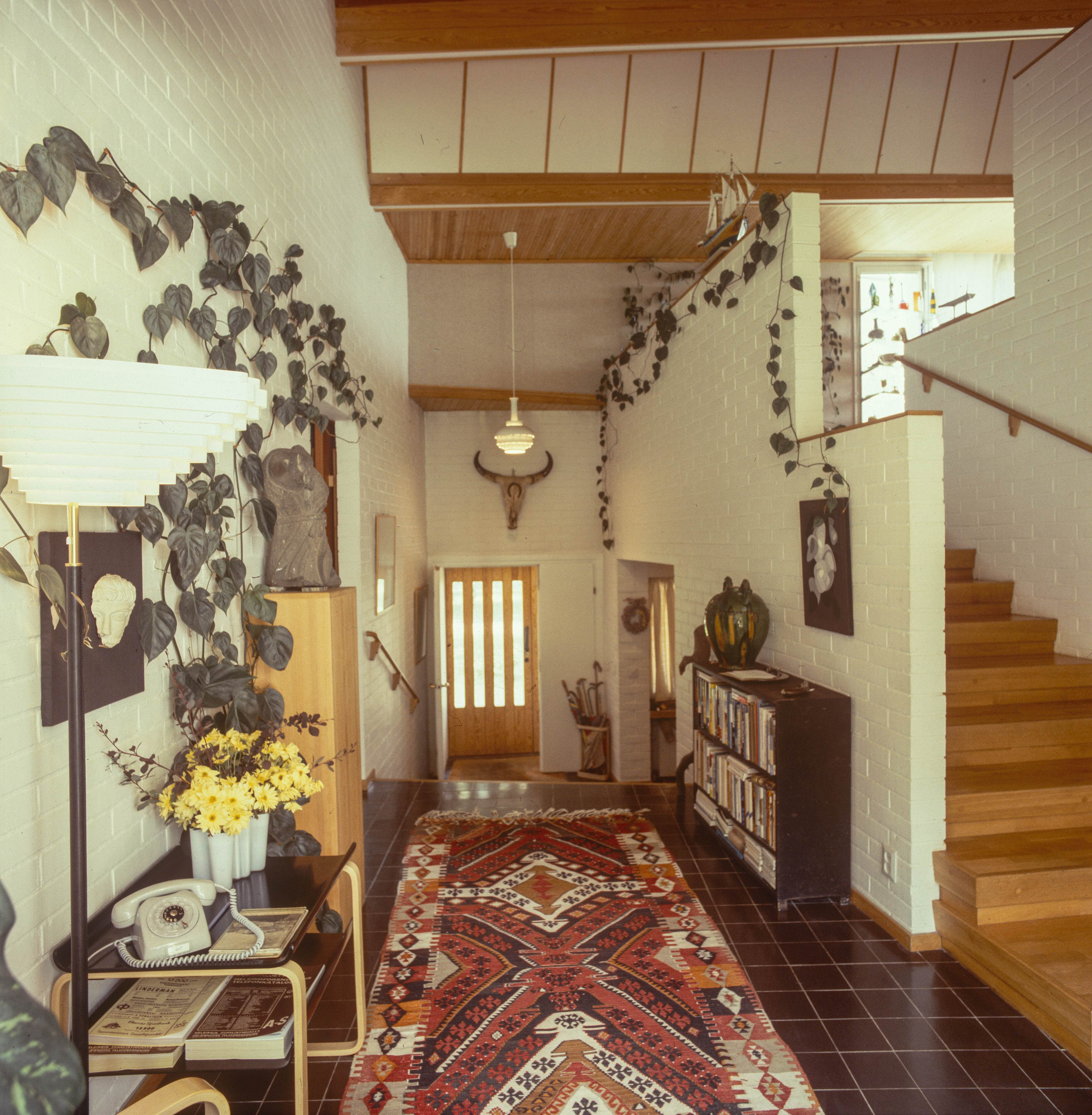
Interior
