= Djurhuus =

May refer to

- Hans Andrias Djurhuus (1883-1951), Faroese poet
- Janus Djurhuus (1881-1948), Faroese poet
- Rune Djurhuus (born 1970), Norwegian chess grandmaster
- Kristian Djurhuus (1895-1984), Faroese politician
- Hákun Djurhuus (1908-1987), Faroese politician
- Jens Christian Djurhuus (1773-1853), Faroese poet
- Marni Djurhuus (born 1985), Faroese footballer
