= Greg Lundgren =

American artist (born 1969)

- Born: 1969 or 1970 (age 56–57); Bellevue, Washington
- Occupations: Artist and funeral monument businessperson

Greg Lundgren is a Seattle-based artist, author, filmmaker and entrepreneur.

== Museum of Museums ==
Lundgren is the founder of Museum of Museums, a contemporary art center in Seattle, Washington.

== Vital 5 Productions ==
Vital 5 Productions was a "one-man arts organization" for which Lundgren won a Genius Award in 2003. The program created exhibits, publications and issued grants. In 2007, it was the subject of an eight-week 911 Media Arts Center retrospective called "Straight to Video: the first 10 years of Vital 5".

Lundgren wrote The Vital 5 Cookbook, published in 2006, as a set of "recipes" for exhibition and self-expression. The title may have been a reference to The Anarchist Cookbook.

Lundgren started Vital 5's Arbitrary Art Grants program in 2009, issuing $500 grants to local artists to "serve as catalysts to create large-scale group projects and performances".

In 2015, Vital 5 Productions retrofitted the 3rd floor of the historic King Street Station in downtown Seattle for contemporary art exhibition. This 22,000 square foot space hosted Out of Sight - a survey of contemporary art in the Pacific Northwest concurrent with the Seattle Art Fair. Giant Steps - a 48 Hour Artist Residency on the Moon, a group exhibition and competition, opened in the space on March 3, 2016. The second year of Out of Sight will launch on August 4, 2016.

== Lundgren Monuments ==
His funeral monument business, Lundgren Monuments, opened in 2004, and he opened a "death boutique" showroom on Seattle's First Hill in 2008 including work by other artists such as Jesse Edwards and Michael Leavitt. Lundgren has been noted for "bring[ing] more art and design into the world" of death care, and creating "a renaissance in the funerary arts in 21st-century America".

Lundgren Monuments specializes in large-scale cast glass monuments with the intent of bringing more color, light and diversity into the cemetery landscape. They also design and build modern urns and host group exhibitions focused on contemporary design and alternatives to traditional death care.

An exhibit at Lundgren Monuments in 2010 was called "the first time in history that a group of architects have focused their talents on the cremation urn as an architectural object".

An urn/artwork called The Final Turn, which he collaborated with architect Tom Kundig in designing, was noted in Robb Report and The New York Times, and is shown in Cooper-Hewitt's National Design Awards gallery.

== The Order of the Good Death ==
Lundgren, along with mortician and author Caitlin Doughty, TED speaker Jae Rhim Lee, alternative funeral home director Jeff Jorgenson, and other death professionals, founded The Order of the Good Death, promoting alternative death care and putting Seattle in the forefront of this new endeavor.

== Awards ==
- The Stranger's Genius Award (Organization), 2003

== Books and film ==
Books

Lundgren has written two children's books and one book about making art.

- Lundgren, Greg (2006), The Vital 5 Cookbook: Recipes for the Contemporary Artist, Curator & Troublemaker, A Vital 5 Production, ISBN 978-0977908004
- Lundgren, Greg (2012), Greenview Cemetery, ISBN 978-0977908011
- Lundgren, Greg (2012), Maybe Death is Like a Light, ISBN 978-0977908028

Film

Lundgren's feature length one-take film CHAT, starring Rosalie Edholm as a camgirl sex worker, was screened at the Northwest Film Forum in July, 2014, and again in September for Seattle's Local Sightings Film Festival.
