= Jesse Edwards (artist) =

American artist (born 1977)

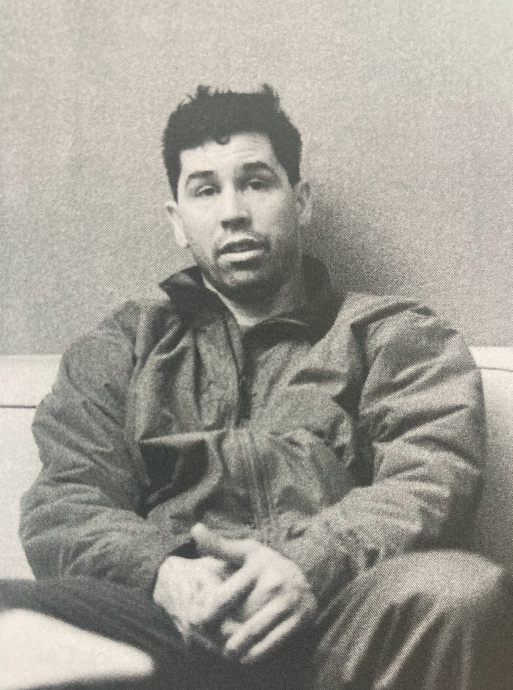
- Born: Jesse Arthur Edwards; 1977 (age 48–49)
- Education: Seattle Academy of Realist Art
- Occupation: Painter
- Years active: 1990 -

Jesse Edwards (born 1977) is an American artist. Known primarily for his figurative and still life oil paintings, using techniques from the European Old Masters, that often provide satirical cultural commentary. His practice also includes painted ceramic sculptures. Edwards studied oil painting at the Gage Academy of Art (2002), and has been exhibiting publicly since. He has been into graffiti twice as long as oil painting or ceramics. After moving from Seattle to New York Edwards acquired representation by Vito Schnabel Edwards work was later chosen by the curators Theo Niarchos and David Rimanelli to be included in group exhibitions alongside works by Harmony Korine, Jean-Michel Basquiat, Andy Warhol, Julian Schnabel, Dan Colen, Dash Snow, and Pablo Picasso.

== Early life and education ==
Edwards' was born in Hayden Lake Idaho in 1977. As a child he started skateboarding and painting graffiti in Snohomish, Washington. He attended Cornish College of Arts in 1999, and, after receiving a scholarship, Gage Academy in 2002. He studied at Gage for three years.

== Art practice ==
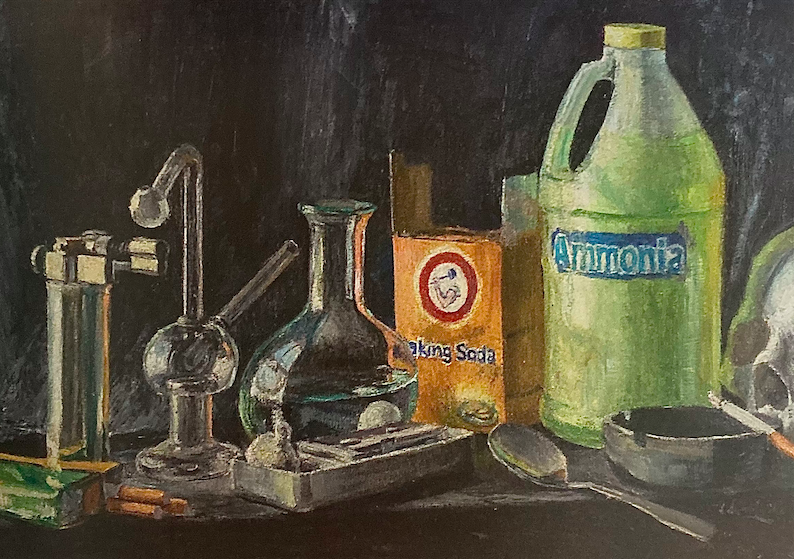
Jesse Edwards, Beauty of Crack II, oil on linen, 2004

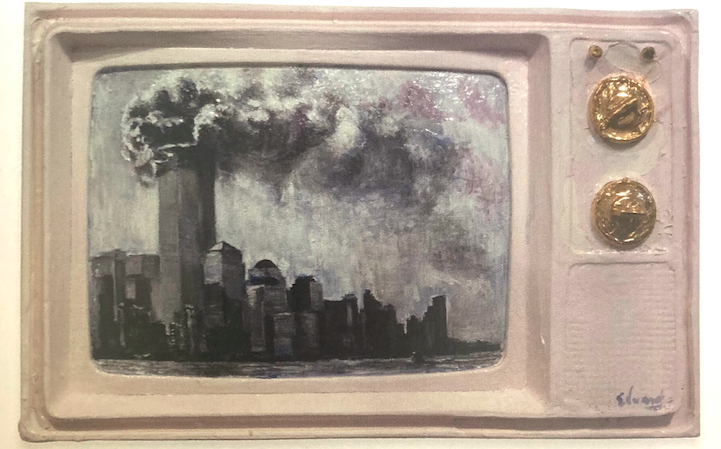
Jesse Edwards, 911, under glaze and over glaze on ceramic, 2006

Edwards uses oil paint on stretched linen, underpainting, and glazing to emulate the style of the Old Masters. Edward’s ceramic glazing techniques have been compared to twentieth century Dutch ceramic painting and Chinese porcelain art. Besides ceramic glaze paint Edwards also occasionally uses decal applications for his sculpture work.

== Selected works ==
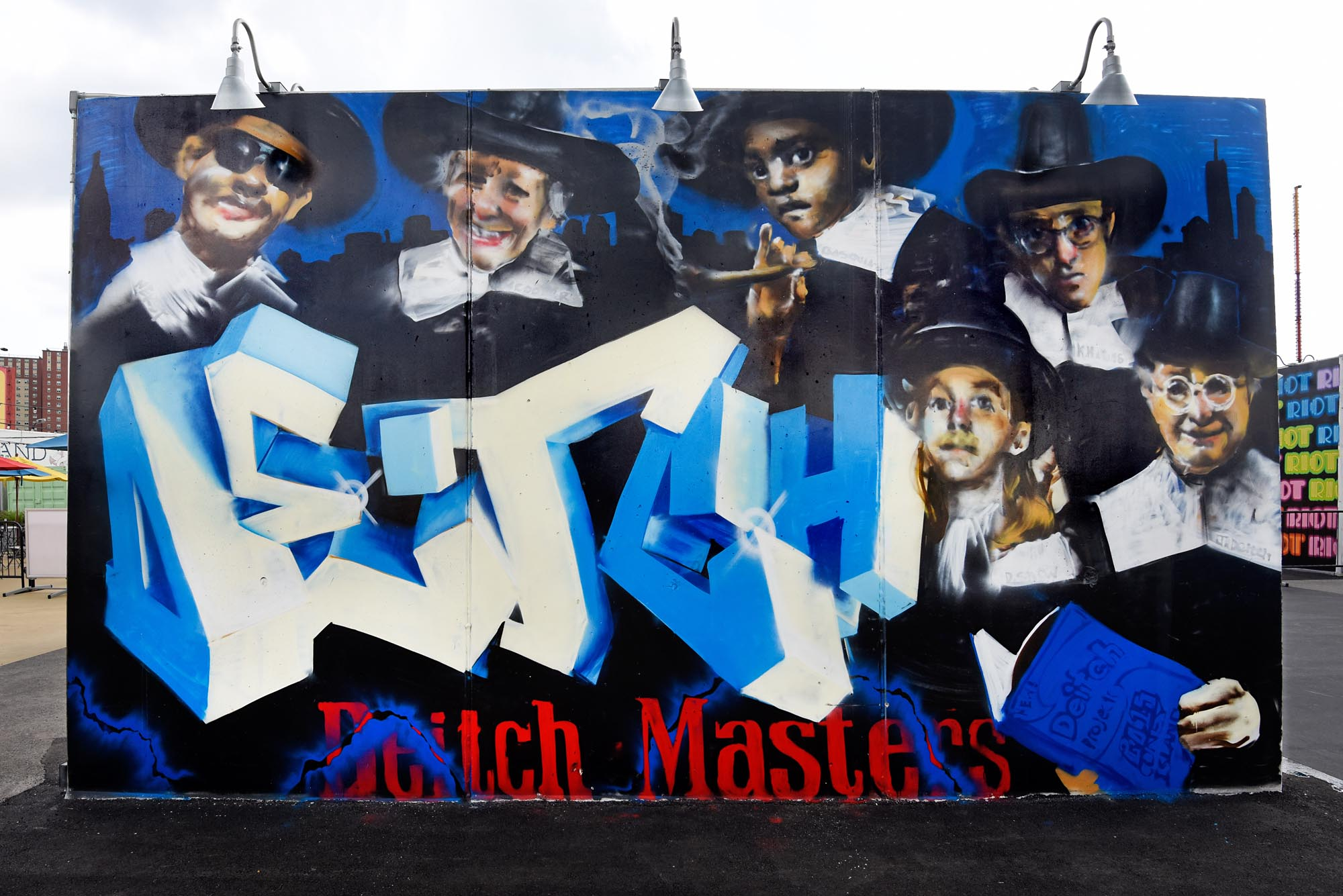
Jesse Edwards, Deitch Masters mural, Coney Art Wall, 2015

- Deitch Masters, for the 2015 Coney Art Walls, was a mural painted by Edwards featuring a 3D graffiti style he developed by painting and modeling from cardboard into a graffiti lettering style 3D sculpture. This mural features the subjects from Rembrandt's Syndics of the Drapers’ Guild and the Dutch Master cigar package. Reinterpreting the Dutch Master cigar package, Edwards replaced the word "Dutch" with "Dietch," a reference to Jeffrey Deitch. Edwards has worked in proximity to Deitch by association with the Hole Gallery and Kathy Grayson who in 2009 worked as the director of Deitch's, Deitch Project.
- Painting Passion Pepe Billboard, located at 6817 Melrose Avenue, was an artwork from 2020 displayed as a billboard advertisement featuring a still life painting of Buttman Magazine, a Vaseline dispenser, a white towel, and the memes Pepe and Wojak. The billboard was created to advertise Edwards' YouTube channel and as an art piece to bring strange memes into the physical world, it eventually became a small meme of its own.

== Painting Passion Pepe Billboard and the Buttman still life ==
Since June 5, 2011 Edwards has been uploading videos to his YouTube including an original series of graffiti-and-rap-centric, comedic instructional painting videos titled Painting Passion. In February 2020, Edwards attracted media attention when he advertised himself with a billboard for his YouTube channel. The billboard placed atop 6817 Gallery in Los Angeles, California, featured the memes Wojak and Pepe wearing a beret, laying in front of a painting by Edwards: a still life featuring the adult magazine Buttman next to a bottle of Vaseline and a white towel.

When asked about the billboard by the Daily Dot Edwards said, “I wanted the billboard to be a piece of art, to take these funky memes into reality..."

The "Masturpiece" still life painting on the billboard was created in Edwards' Painting Passion YouTube episode 3 instructional video.

An image of the still life was eventually published in print on the inside cover of Buttman Magazine Volume 16, Number 5.

== Exhibitions ==
=== Solo ===
- Fine Art Ceramic Works, Woodside Braseth Gallery, Seattle, 2007 New Paintings and Private Book Release, 122 Ludlow, New York, 2010
- Dialogue of the Streets, Klughaus Gallery, New York 2012
- Let's Watch TV All Day, 6817 gallery, Los Angeles, 2015
- See the Words I Can't Say, New Release Gallery, New York, 2017
- House of Cards, Diane Rosenstein, Los Angeles, 2019
- Blacksheep, No Gallery, Los Angeles, 2020

=== Group ===
- Pushing Five, BLVD Gallery, Seattle, 2006
- Help is On The Way, 122 Ludlow, New York, 2010
- Summer Reading, The Hole Gallery, New York, 2013
- ROCK | THEM, ROX Gallery, New York, 2013
- DSM-V, The Future Moynihan Station, New York, 2013
- Erik Brunetti & Jesse Edwards, Vito Schnabel Gallery, New York, 2014
- Go With The Flow, The Hole Gallery, New York, 2014
- Chrome Hearts, Art Basel, Miami, 2017
- Old Glory, Mulherin Gallery, New York, 2017
- Untitled, Diane Rosenstein, Miami, 2018
- Painting’s Favorite Food: Art History as Muse, South Etna Montauk, curated by Alison M. Gingeras, New York, 2020
- Blast Over, Christian Rex Van Minnen, Gallery Ruttkowski;68, Paris, 2020
- Riders of the Red Horse, The Pit Gallery, Los Angeles, 2020
- Go Figure, Todd James, Hong Kong, 2021

== Art Market ==
Limited public market information is available. In April 2021 an Artsy.net listing for an oil painting from 2020 titled "Pandemic Painting" was priced at $16,500.

== Recognition ==
Edward's was awarded the North Hill Residency from Stefan Simchowitz in Pasadena, California. He was provided three kilns for his ceramic work.

== Bibliography ==
- Vito Schnabel, Alison M. Gingeras and David Rimanelli, Jesse Edwards Monograph, 2015
