= Arthur Lundrigan =

Canadian businessman (1922–2000)

Arthur Raymond Lundrigan, OC, LL.D., D.Eng. (13 July 1922 – 8 May 2000) was a Canadian businessman based in Newfoundland and Labrador, involved in the development and construction of such projects as the Bay d'Espoir Hydroelectric Power Station, the Churchill Falls Generating Station, and the Come By Chance Refinery.

== Personal life ==
Lundrigan was born to William J. and Naomi (Dawe) Lundrigan in Blaketown, Newfoundland and Labrador in 1922. After relocating to Corner Brook, he married Ida Johnson in 1946. They had four daughters together, including Gudie Hutchings. Lundrigan died after a lengthy illness at Corner Brook, Newfoundland and Labrador on 8 May 2000, aged 77.

== Business career ==
Lundrigan left school in Corner Brook with a seventh-grade education to join his father, William, at the latter's sawmill in 1936. The family firm expanded into logging, wood-working, and a building supplies retail outlet during World War II and was incorporated as William J. Lundrigan Limited in 1947. The company expanded rapidly after Newfoundland joined Canada in 1949 in the construction and manufacturing fields, including major work on road paving and building the Trans-Canada Highway in Newfoundland, building and operating gypsum wallboard and cement plants in Corner Brook, construction of commercial buildings, schools, and hospitals throughout Atlantic Canada, and various retail operations. The company's operations expanded across Canada and construction projects were undertaken across the globe, including the United States, Bermuda, and Saudi Arabia, and at the time was considered to be among Newfoundland's largest employers.

Arthur Lundrigan took on increasing responsibility within the company, serving first as Vice President and then, after reorganization in 1966 as Lundrigans Limited, as President and Chief Executive Officer. He is credited as a major contributor to the rapid growth of the family business, particularly with the company expanding into large construction projects, establishing a sizable real estate portfolio, and expanding operations into Nova Scotia, New Brunswick, and Ontario. He continued in his role as President and CEO of Lundrigans through the acquisition of Comstock International in 1979 and another reorganization in 1982 as The Lundrigan Group Ltd. until he became Chairman in 1983 and relinquished his position as President and CEO to his brother Harold. The company would continue to expand and was renamed Lundrigans-Comstock Limited in 1987, by which point the company had grown to 1,200 employees in Newfoundland and 2,600 employees in the rest of Canada, with revenues in excess of $350 million.

In addition to his roles at Lundrigans, he was a founding member of the Joseph R. Smallwood Heritage Foundation, Chairman of North Star Cement, President of Newfoundland Steel Ltd., a member of the Advisory Board of Central Guaranty Trust, and a director of the Bank of Montreal, Ultramar, Sobeys, NewTel Communications, Humber Valley Broadcasting Corporation, and Maritime Life Assurance. Lundrigan also served as a member of the Royal Commission on the Economic State and Prospects of Newfoundland and Labrador, the Export Trade Development Board (on appointment by Prime Minister Trudeau), and the International Trade Advisory Committee (on appointment by Prime Minister Mulroney).

== Political career ==
Beyond business, Arthur Lundrigan was a leading adviser to Premier Joseph Smallwood and in 1969 there was speculation that he would be a strong contender to succeed Smallwood if he chose to run, being publicly mentioned as a potential successor by the then-Premier himself. This connection was not without controversy, however. In 1972 a Royal Commission was appointed by newly elected Premier Frank Moores to investigate allegations that the liquor commission was paying "exorbitant" rents, which was chaired by former Lieutenant-Governor Fabian O'Dea. The Commission's report in July 1972 found that Premier Smallwood, Lundrigan, and former deputy minister Oliver Vardy were shareholders in a company that held seven buildings being rented to the liquor corporation. A week later two of Moores' ministers traveled to Toronto to meet with John Robinette to advise on what action could be taken against the implicated parties. No charges were ever brought. While Oliver Vardy would later be charged with fraud, breach of public trust, and accepting kickbacks for separate scandals, no charges were ever brought against Lundrigan or against anyone related to the Royal Commission's findings on liquor commission rents. Premier Moores was even reported as saying that had he known what would have come of the commission he would never have appointed it in the first place.

== Awards and recognition ==
Lundrigan received an Honorary Doctor of Laws degree from Memorial University of Newfoundland in May 1981 and an Honorary Doctor of Engineering from Dalhousie University in 1984. He was appointed an Officer of the Order of Canada on 1 November 1991. His citation reads:

This Newfoundland entrepreneur employs hundreds of Canadians in his family business which has expanded to become an international organization. His commitment to the well-being of his province is evident in his philanthropic and volunteer endeavours. These range from the development of Memorial University to the establishment of a foundation to publish books on Newfoundland history.

He and his brother Harold were inducted into the Junior Achievement Newfoundland and Labrador Business Hall of Fame in 2000, where they were recognized as being "respected for building much of the infrastructure that exists in Newfoundland & Labrador today."
