= Seamus Conley =

American painter

Seamus Conley (born 1976) is an artist originally from Los Angeles. He currently lives, works, and exhibits in San Francisco. A recipient of the Pollock/Krasner award, his work has been reviewed and published in Art Ltd and Fine Art Connoisseur In 2008, 7x7 Magazine listed him as one of the "14 Bay Area artists we love right now."
