= Harold Lundrigan =

Canadian construction businessman

Harold Wilson Lundrigan, CM (29 February 1928 – 18 December 2009) was a Canadian construction businessman based in Newfoundland and Labrador. His construction projects included oversight of the initial paving of the Trans-Canada Highway in his province.

He earned a Diploma of Engineering degree from Memorial University of Newfoundland then three years later an engineering degree from Nova Scotia Technical College. Lundrigan served as the first Chairman of the Economic Council of Newfoundland and Labrador, Chairman of the Royal Commission on Employment and Unemployment and served as a member of the Atlantic Provinces Economic Council.

He was appointed a member of the Order of Canada in April 1991.

He and his brother Arthur were inducted into the Junior Achievement Newfoundland and Labrador Business Hall of Fame in 2000.

Lundrigan died at Corner Brook, Newfoundland and Labrador on 18 December 2009 aged 81.
