= Göran Schildt =

Finnish Swede author and art historian (1917–2009

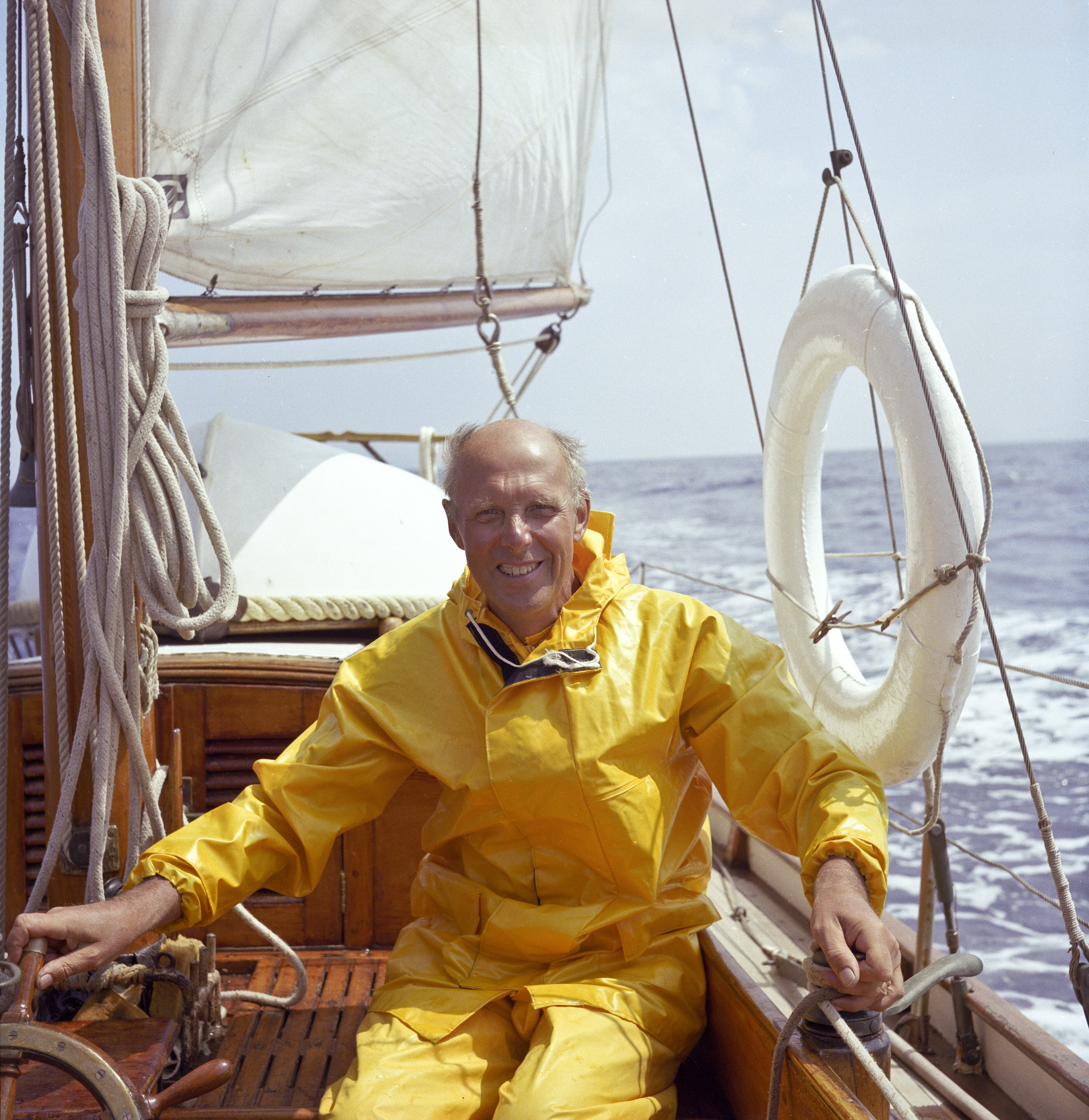
- Göran Schildt onboard S/Y Daphne in 1970
- Born: 11 March 1917; Helsinki, Finland
- Died: 24 January 2009 (aged 91); Ekenäs, Finland
- Education: University of Helsinki
- Occupations: Author, art historian
- Spouse(s): Mona Morales-Schildt (1941–1964); Christine Schildt, born Werthmann (1940–) 1966–

Gustaf Ernst Göran Schildt (11 March 1917 – 24 January 2009) was a Finnish Swede author and art historian. He was the son of the author Runar Schildt and Miia Mathilda Heikel.

== Life and work ==
Schildt is perhaps best known for his travelogues with the sailboat Daphne. He made the decision to become a Mediterranean sailor after being seriously injured during the Finnish Winter War and forced to spend a year and a half in hospital. "Then I thought that if I can do this, I will realize my dream: I will get a boat and sail around all corners of the Mediterranean," he later said. The architect Alvar Aalto was one of the guests at Daphne and their lifelong friendship was the basis for Schildt's masterpiece, the three-part biography of Aalto.

Schildt went to school at the Nya Svenska Läroverket in Helsinki], graduating in 1934. He studied languages at the Sorbonne in Paris from 1934 to 1935, earned a Master of Arts degree from the University of Helsinki in 1943, and received his doctorate in philosophy with a dissertation on the painter Cezanne and also studied languages at the Sorbonne in Paris. He moved to Sweden in 1945 and was an art and literature critic for Svenska Dagbladet 1950–1990. He was offered a professorship in art history the University of Helsinki, but chose to continue as a writer.

Göran Schildt lived in Villa Skeppet in Ekenäs in Finland and in Villa Kolkis on the island of Leros in Greece. He was married from 1941–1964 to the glass artist Monica Ulrika Morales (known as Mona Morales-Schildt), and from 1966 to Christine Ellen Helene Schildt, born Werthmann (1940–).

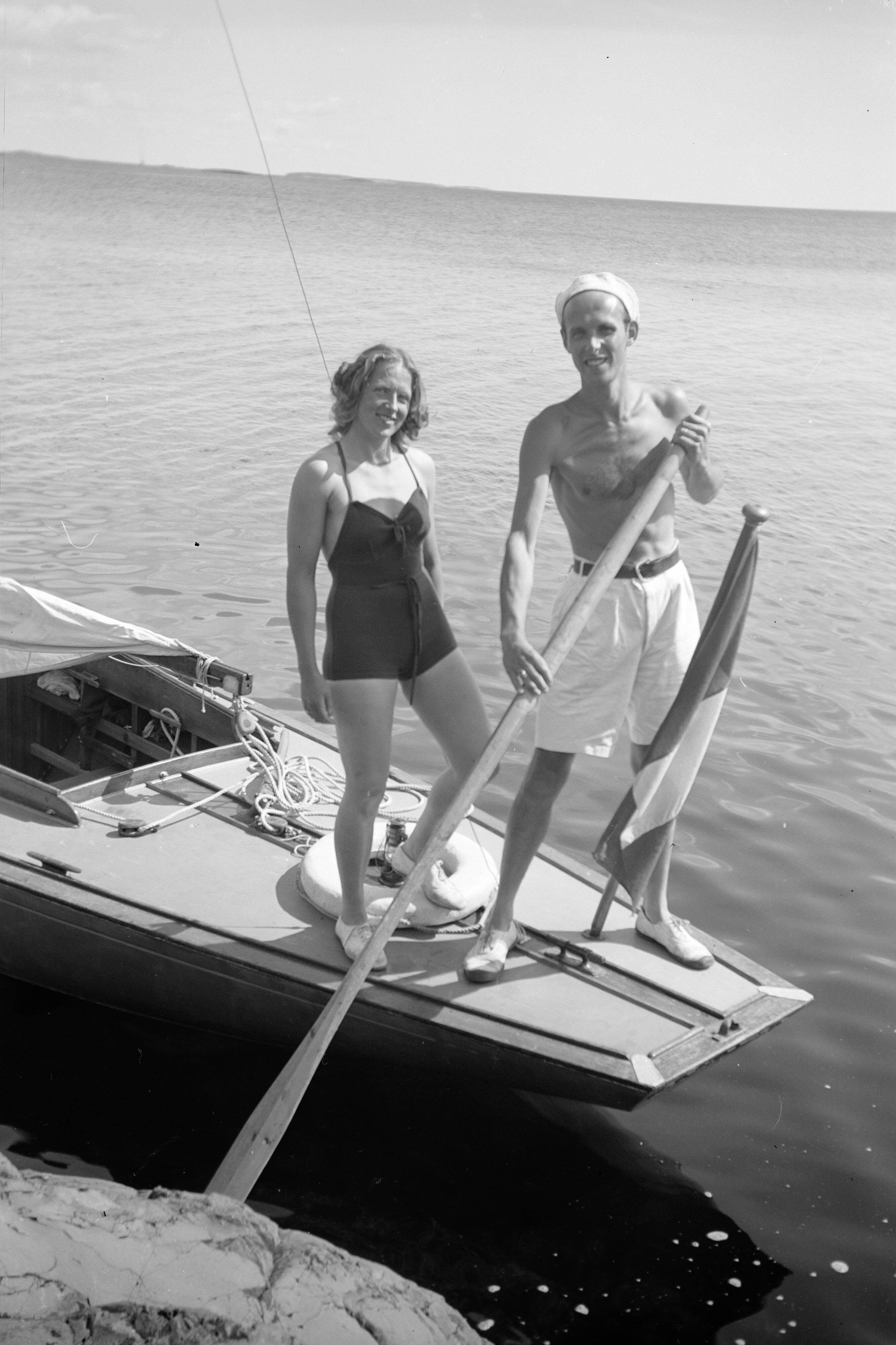
Göran Schildt and Mona Morales-Schildt

== Publications ==
Schildt has written at least 30 publications in Swedish.His doctoral dissertation from 1947 was titled Riktlinjer för en enhetlig psykologisk tolkning av Paul Cezannes personlighet och konst mot bakgrunden av den allmänna romantiska livskonflikten (Guidelines for a unified psychological interpretation of Paul Cezanne's personality and art against the background of the general romantic conflict of life).

Among his publications in English is In the Wake of Odysseus (Staples Press, 1953).The original Swedish edition was titled I Odysseus kölvatten (1951).

A selection of his original works in Swedish includes:

- Önskeleken (1943)
- Cezanne (1946)
- Gide och människan (1946)
- Önskeresan (1949)
- I Odysseus kölvatten (1951)
- Daphne och Apollon (1952)
- Paris’ hemliga tecken (1952)
- Tre veckor i Sovjet (1954)
- Medelhav (1955, with Roberto Sambonet)
- Solbåten (1956)
- Ikaros’ hav (1957)
- Med Daphne i sexton länder (1960)
- Världsögat och individen (1960)
- Resa på Nilen (1962)
- Upptäcktsfärd i Sverige (1962)
- Kontrakurs (1963)
- Det gyllene skinnet (1964)
- Loggbok. Stockholm — Rapallo (1966)
- Segla på Medelhavet (1969)
- Skulptur i Finland (1970)
- Dianas ö (1976)

Schildt also translated several works into Swedish, particularly by André Gide, including Vatikanens källare (1943), Om inte vetekornet dör (1946), and Äktenskapsskolan (1948). Additionally, he edited and wrote introductions for several books, including editions of A. E. Nordenskiöld's Vegas färd kring Asien och Europa (1960) and Carl Gustaf Emil Mannerheim's Till häst genom Asien (1961).

== Awards and recognition ==
Person has received the following awards and recognition:

- 1950 – Mauritz Hallberg Prize
- 1952 – Tollanderska Prize
- 1981 – Svenska Akademiens Finlandspris
- 1991 – Tollanderska Prize
- 2000 – Member of Royal Swedish Academy of Fine Arts
