= Liz Craft =

American sculptor

Liz Craft (born 1970) is a Los Angeles installation artist and sculptor. She co-runs the Paradise Garage in Venice Beach, California. Her artwork has been exhibited internationally and collected by museums including the Los Angeles County Museum of Art, LACMA, and the Hammer Museum in Los Angeles.

== Biography ==
Born in Los Angeles in 1970, Craft grew up in Mammoth Lakes, California. She received a Bachelor of Arts from Otis Parsons in 1994 and a Master of Fine Art from the University of California, Los Angeles in 1997.

Craft has exhibited internationally, with her first solo exhibition in 1998 at Richard Telles Fine Art in Los Angeles. Craft was featured in the Whitney Biennial of 2004. She creates "faux-naïve figurative sculptures and irreverent and whimsical images" that examine preconceived notions about marginalized groups. Such as the countercultural types and women. Working in a range of media, Craft demonstrates a keen sense for color and its ability to elicit cultural connotations, as in her use of pastels in a series of works about femininity and labor in the home. She uses text and cartoonish modeling to show figures, she represents her materials, often including collaged, readymade elements that refer to the private and personal. She is more interested in represent an idea mode rather than the subject things. She has said, "The theme in [much of my work] can be so powerful that I feel it's important to include the methodology.”

== Selected solo exhibitions ==
- Blow Me, Real Fine Arts, New York (2016)
- Big Girls, Truth & Consequences, Geneva (2015)
- Death Of A Clown, Patrick Painter Inc., Santa Monica, CA (2010)
- Past and Present, Marianne Boesky Gallery, New York (2010)
- Project Room: Liz Craft, Alison Jacques Gallery, London (2009)
- Patrick Painter Inc., Santa Monica, CA (2008)
