= Tyra Lundgren =

Swedish artist, designer, and writer (1897–1979)

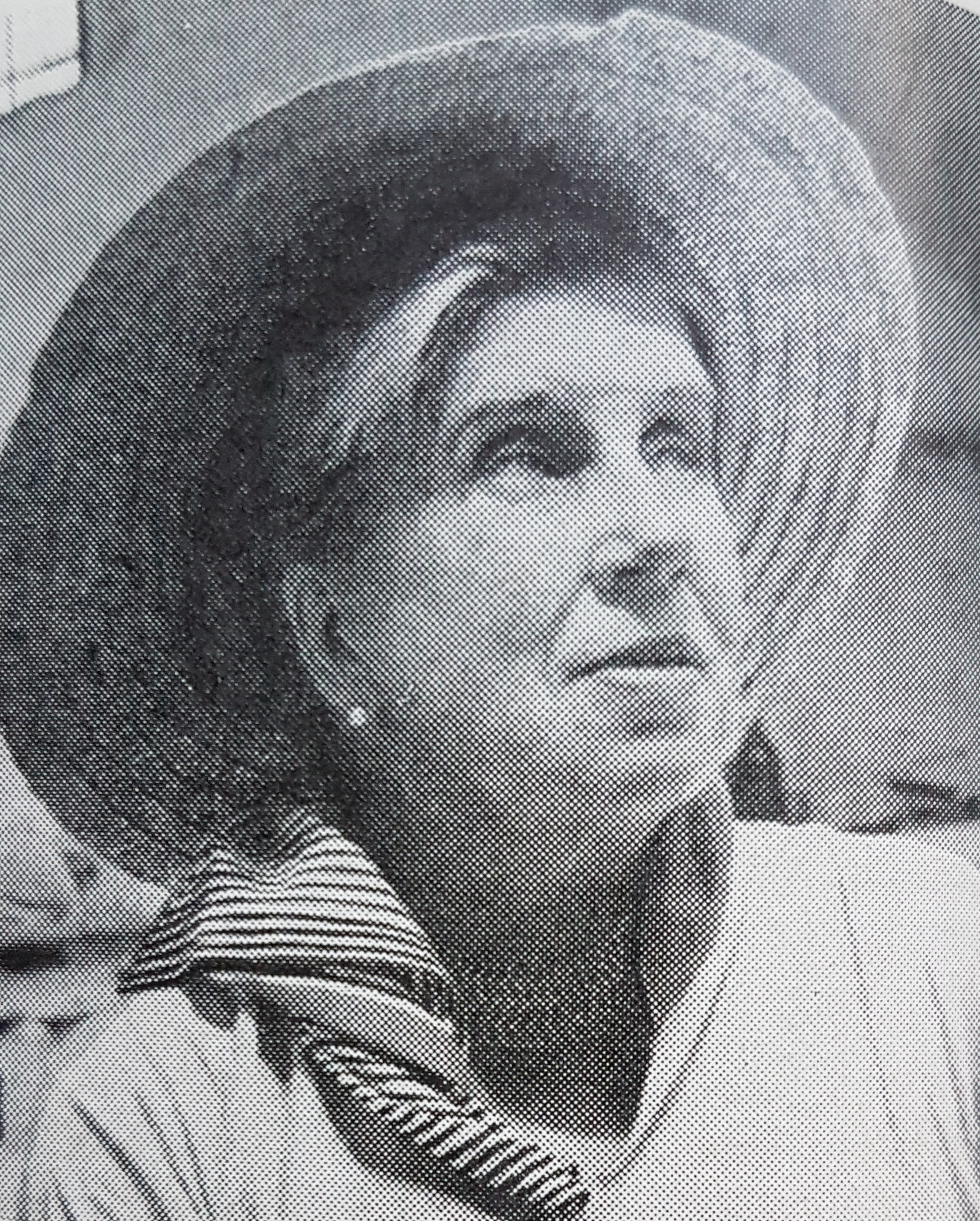
- Tyra Lundgren
- Born: Tyra Carolina Lundgren; 9 January 1897; Stockholm, Sweden
- Died: 20 November 1979 (aged 82); Stockholm, Sweden
- Occupations: Artist; designer; writer

Tyra Carolina Lundgren (9 January 1897 – 20 November 1979) was a Swedish painter, ceramist, glass and textile designer, and writer. One of the most versatile artists and modernists of the 20th century, Lundgren was the first woman to design glass for Paolo Venini and emerged as a pioneer of the Swedish Grace style. In 1950, she was awarded the Swedish royal medal Litteris et Artibus in recognition of her artistic career.

== Early life and education ==
Tyra Lundgren was born on 9 January 1897 into a family of six children in Stockholm, Sweden. She was the daughter of John Petter Lundgren, a professor at Veterinärinstitutet, and Edith, née Åberg. Growing up in an affluent and socially active family, Lundgren discovered her love for art. She attended Djursholm coeducational school, where she was taught by Natanael and Elsa Beskow, and Alice Tegnérgrew. In 1913, Lundgren joined Högre konstindustriella skolan, where she received lessons on decorative art and handicrafts, and remained at the school for four years. She also simultaneously received painting lessons at Althin, a painting school. She subsequently became a student at the Royal Swedish Academy of Fine Arts in 1917, while also studying under Anton Hanak in Vienna and André Lhote in Paris. She graduated in 1922.

== Artistic career ==
=== Painting career ===
Lundgren spent much of her life travelling, and her stylistic developments have been linked to the periods she spent living in different places across Europe. Birds, fish, and people became the main subjects of her paintings, which she depicted through a variety of techniques and materials. During her stay in Paris in 1920, she used her palette to paint portraits, live-model painting, landscapes, still-life compositions, and interiors in the Cubist style. Her self-portraits, made in the New Objective style, vary in intensity, clothes, poses, and techniques. The period 1927 to 1929 was a breakthrough in her artistic career. She created mostly still-lifes and landscapes, executed in the New Objective style. Between 1950 and 1970, her paintings employed both light pastels and vivid brushstrokes, and represented non-figurative and abstract art.

Her compositions were first exhibited at Kungliga Akademien för de fria konsterna in 1921, and subsequently at several exhibitions throughout the 1920s.

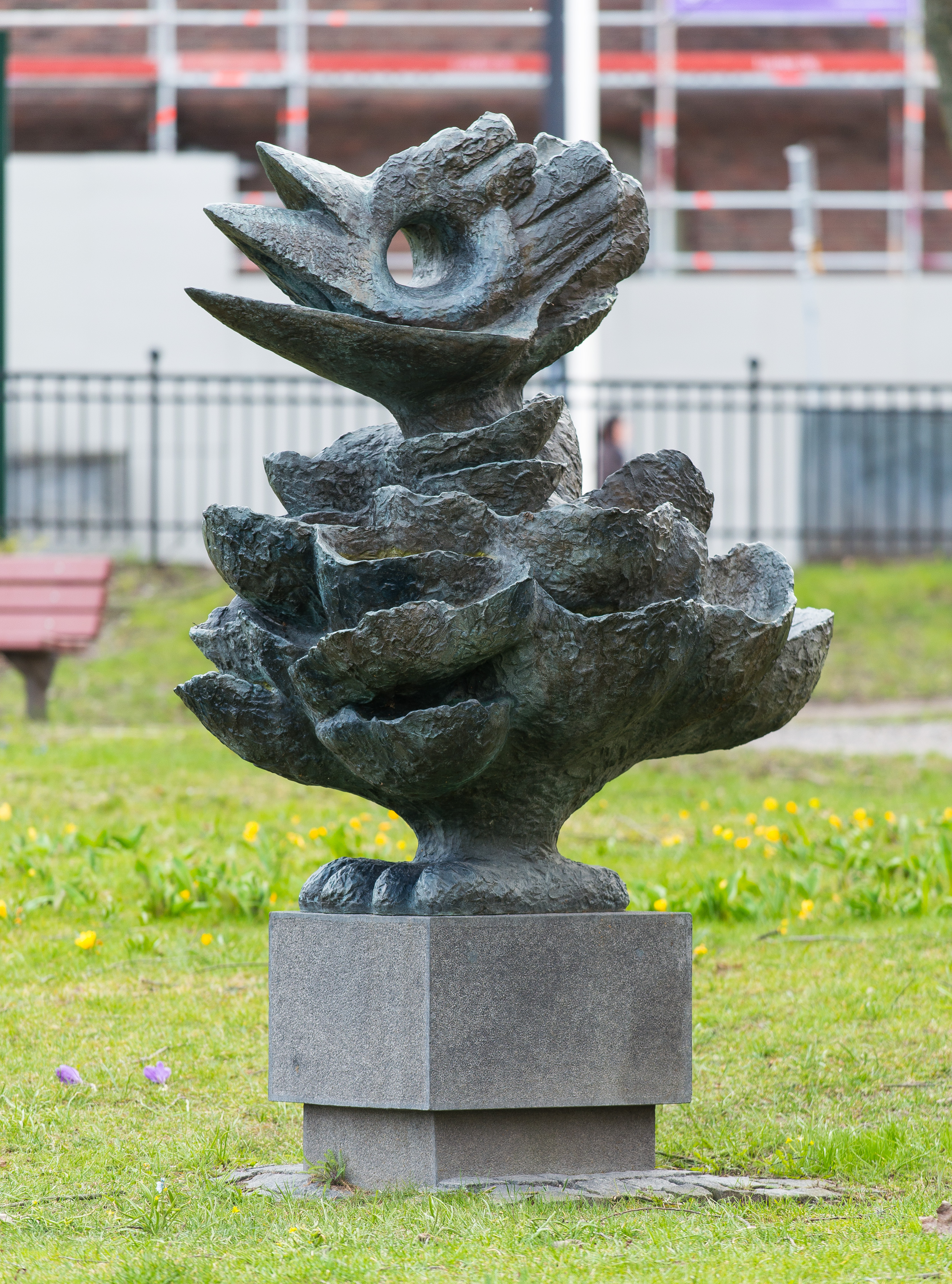
Fågel blå in Stockholm, Sweden

=== Ceramics ===
Lundgren is perhaps best known as a ceramist, and she worked both as a designer and sculptor in the porcelain industry. From 1922 to 1924, she worked for porcelain company St Eriks Lervarufabrik, and later for Arabia and Rörstrand. During this time, she became one of Sweden's leading exponents, serving as the artistic leader at Arabia ahead of the 1930 Stockholm Exhibition. From 1934 to 1938, she worked for the Manufacture nationale de Sèvres in Paris. She also designed stoneware monumental reliefs, including Märkeskvinnor at Bohusgatan, Stockholm. Later, she produced sculptural models using Chamotte clay, stoneware, and bronze.

=== Glass and textile designing ===
Lundgren was productive in the field of glass design. In 1922, Lundgren worked as a glassware designer at Moser in Karlsbad. She worked on new table designs and altered older ones. Between 1924 and 1999, she worked as a freelance designer for the Riihimäki factory in Finland, and during the period 1934–1938, she worked for Kosta glassworks designing bowls and vases in classical style. In 1936, she met the glassmaker Paolo Venini at the Triennale di Milano. This meeting initiated a collaboration that remained till the 1950s. She subsequently became the first woman to design glassware for Venini. She also worked as a textile designer for Licium and for NK's Textilkammare, for which she created 13 models.

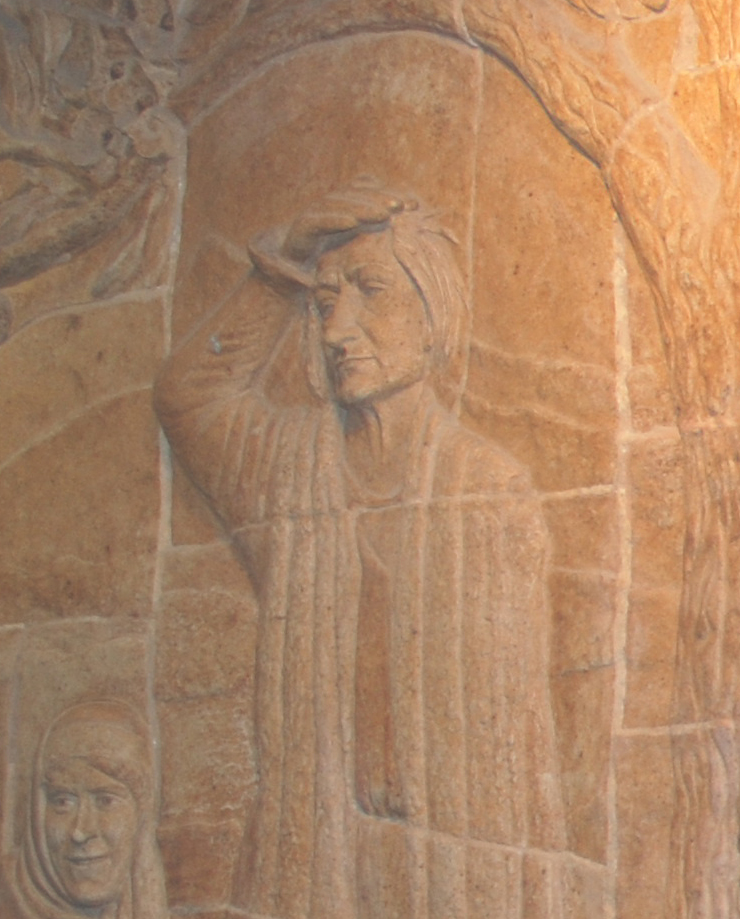
Märkeskvinnor (1947)

=== Writing career ===
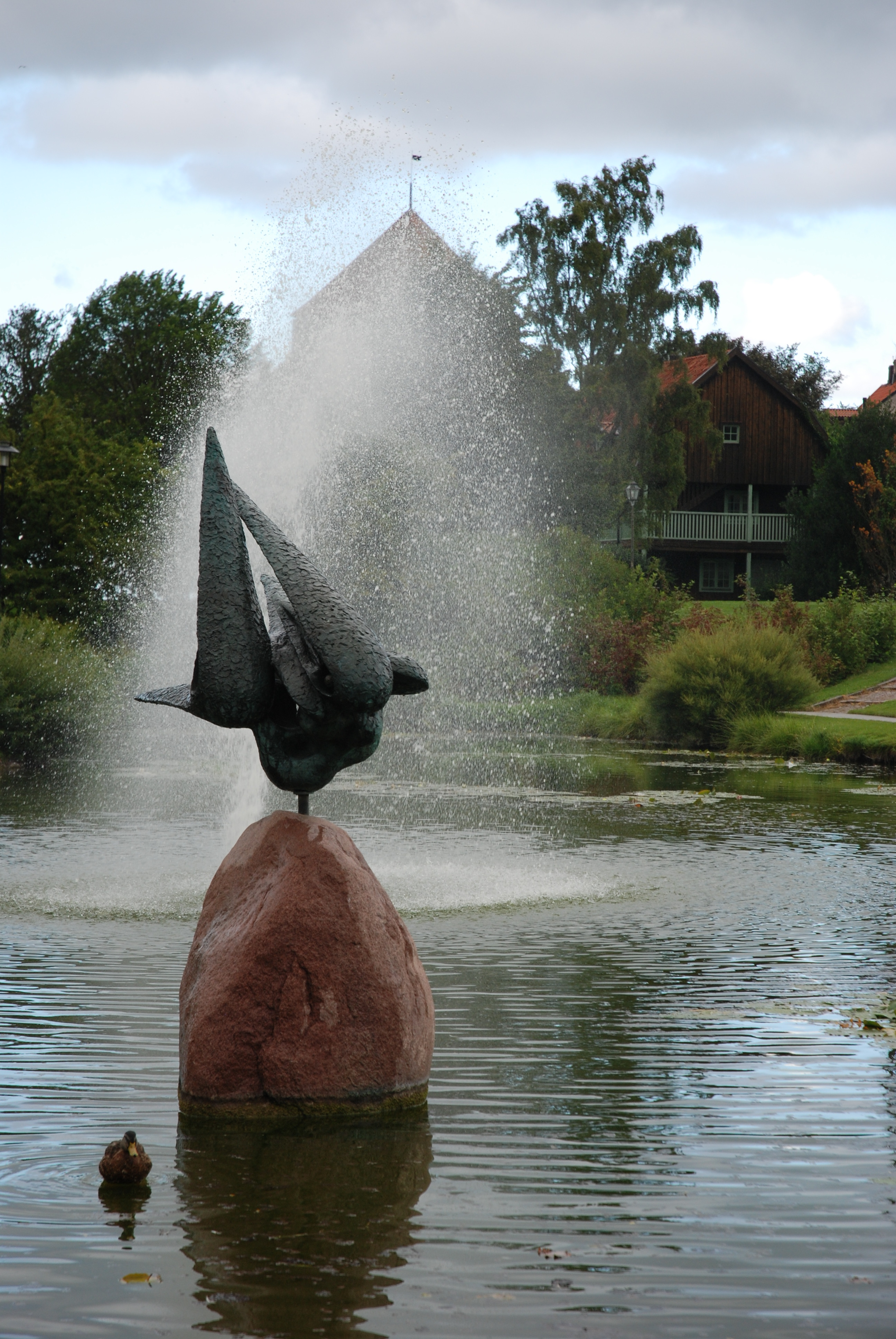
Solfågel

Lundgren began her writing career by contributing articles to the art journal Konstrevy. Between 1930 and 1940, she wrote for Form and for Svenska hem i ord och bilder. She was among the editors of the magazine Hem i Sverige. She self-published three books- Lera och eld. Ett keramiskt vagabondage i Europa (1946), Fagert i Fide. Årstiderna på en gammal gotlandsgård (1961), and Märta Måås-Fjetterström och väv-verkstaden i Båstad (1968).

== Later years ==
In 1950, she was honoured with the Swedish royal medal Litteris et Artibus for her outstanding contributions to art. The following year, she was awarded a gold medal by Triennale di Milano.

Lundgren died in Stockholm on 20 November 1979.
