= Anna Lindgren =

Swedish politician (1946–2015)

Anna Lindgren (10 May 1946 – 16 April 2015) was a Swedish Moderate Party politician and former member of the Riksdag.

Lindgren was a teacher and local politician in Linköping before being elected in 2002. She declined to stand again in 2006. She is married to Sven Lindgren, the Governor of Kalmar County.
