= Emmaboda Municipality =

Emmaboda Municipality Emmaboda kommun
- Municipality
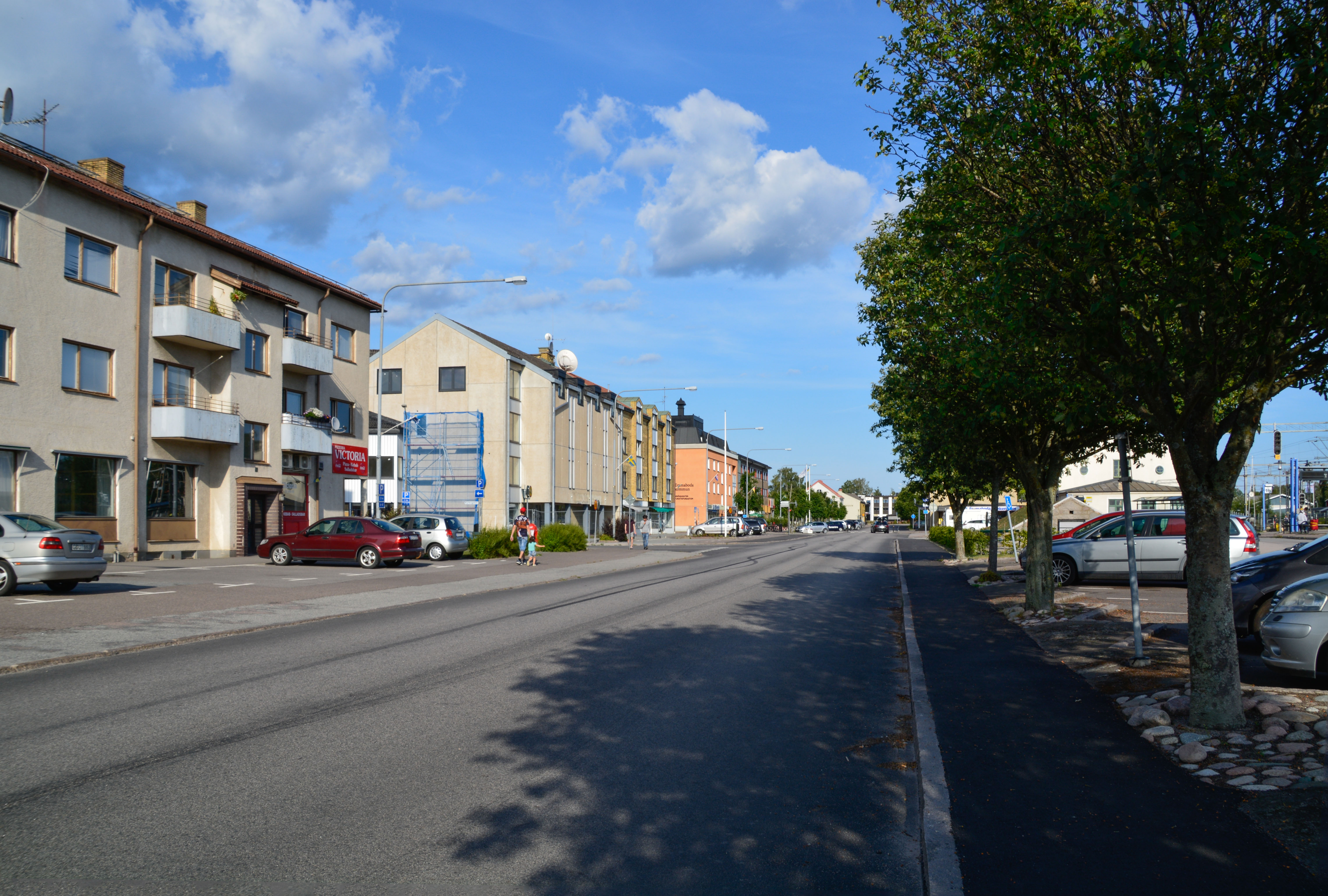

- Coat of arms

- Coordinates: 56°37′N 15°33′E
- Country: Sweden
- County: Kalmar County
- Seat: Emmaboda

Area
  - Total: 718.65 km^{2} (277.47 sq mi)
  - Land: 689.7 km^{2} (266.3 sq mi)
  - Water: 28.95 km^{2} (11.18 sq mi)
- Area as of 1 January 2014.

Population (30 June 2025)
  - Total: 8,925
  - Density: 12.94/km^{2} (33.52/sq mi)
- Time zone: UTC+1 (CET)
  - Summer (DST): UTC+2 (CEST)
- ISO 3166 code: SE
- Province: Småland
- Municipal code: 0862
- Website: www.emmaboda.se

Emmaboda Municipality (Swedish: Emmaboda kommun) is a municipality in Kalmar County, in south-eastern Sweden. Its seat is located in the town Emmaboda.

The present municipality was formed in 1971, when the market town (köping) of Emmaboda (itself instituted in 1930) was amalgamated with three surrounding rural municipalities.

== Geography ==
The municipality borders to the municipalities of Nybro, Kalmar and Torsås in Kalmar County; to Karlskrona and Ronneby in Blekinge County; and Tingsryd and Lessebo in Kronoberg County. The nearest cities in its vicinity are Kalmar (pop. 35,170), Karlskrona (pop. 32,606), Växjö (pop. 55,600), and Nybro (pop. 12,598).

It is part of Glasriket, The Realm of Glass, where people have been producing glass products at least since the 17th century, and transported them to the rest of Sweden. The glassworks in Emmaboda municipality are mainly Johansfors, Åfors and Boda, the latter being one part of the supplier for the glass sculptor Kosta Boda.

Those interested in nature activities will find many opportunities of fishing in the many lakes and streams stretching through the municipality.

=== Localities ===
There are 6 urban areas (also called a tätort or locality) in Emmaboda Municipality.

In the table the localities are listed according to the size of the population as of December 31, 2005. The municipal seat is in bold characters.

#	Locality	Population
1	**Emmaboda**	4,968
2	Vissefjärda	673
3	Johansfors	458
4	Långasjö	340
5	Eriksmåla	238
6	Boda glasbruk	201

== Demographics ==
This is a demographic table based on Emmaboda Municipality's electoral districts in the 2022 Swedish general election sourced from SVT's election platform, in turn taken from SCB official statistics.

In total there were 9,300 residents, including 6,884 Swedish citizens of voting age. 47.3% voted for the left coalition and 51.3% for the right coalition. Indicators are in percentage points except population totals and income.

Location	Residents	Citizen adults	Left vote	Right vote	Employed	Swedish parents	Foreign heritage	Income SEK	Degree
Location			%	%					
Algutsboda	1,619	1,188	40.7	57.7	78	78	22	21,509	30
Emmaboda N	1,676	1,306	51.9	47.4	82	75	25	26,081	30
Emmaboda S	2,205	1,517	55.1	43.1	64	58	42	19,295	26
Lindås	1,592	1,183	43.8	55.1	79	83	17	25,035	29
Långasjö	850	670	43.1	55.9	84	91	9	24,667	29
Vissefjärda	1,358	1,020	45.9	52.3	82	87	13	23,385	33
Source: SVT

== Culture ==
The Emigrants, the works about the Swedish emigration to North America, written by Vilhelm Moberg that have spread around the world have put a focus on many places in the municipality mentioned in the novels. Moberg himself was born on a farm just north-west of the town Emmaboda in 1898, where a monument stone now stands since 1970. Nearby is also a small museum about the author. Duvemåla, the village where Karl Oskar and Kristina, the fictional main characters of the novels live, is also located in the municipality.

Historically, the dense forests in this area were a centre for Nils Dacke's rebellion fights against King Gustav Vasa in the 16th century, causing the king great troubles for a while, until he sent down troops gathered from the other provinces of Sweden. Naturally, the area today contains several remains and folk museums in honour of this time.

Every year in August, Emmaboda hosts a music festival called Emmabodafestivalen. The festival bill consists of various indie acts, mostly Swedish. In 2006 acts like José González and Hello Saferide played. The Magic Numbers were scheduled to play, but were held up at an airport and could not make it.

== Industry ==
The largest employer is ITT Water & Wastewater, with a world-wide reputation for their submersible pumps and mixers for waste water treatment and pumping (mining, construction, municipal and industrial markets), with some 1,400 employees in the municipality.

== Sister cities ==
Emmaboda has seven sister cities; of these the municipality only has regular contact with the two listed at the bottom:

- Jeppo, Finland
- Kvam, Norway
- Jyderup, Denmark
- Lefkada, Greece
- Pionersky, Kaliningrad, Russia
- Bartoszyce, Poland
- North Bay, Ontario, Canada
