= Emmaboda =

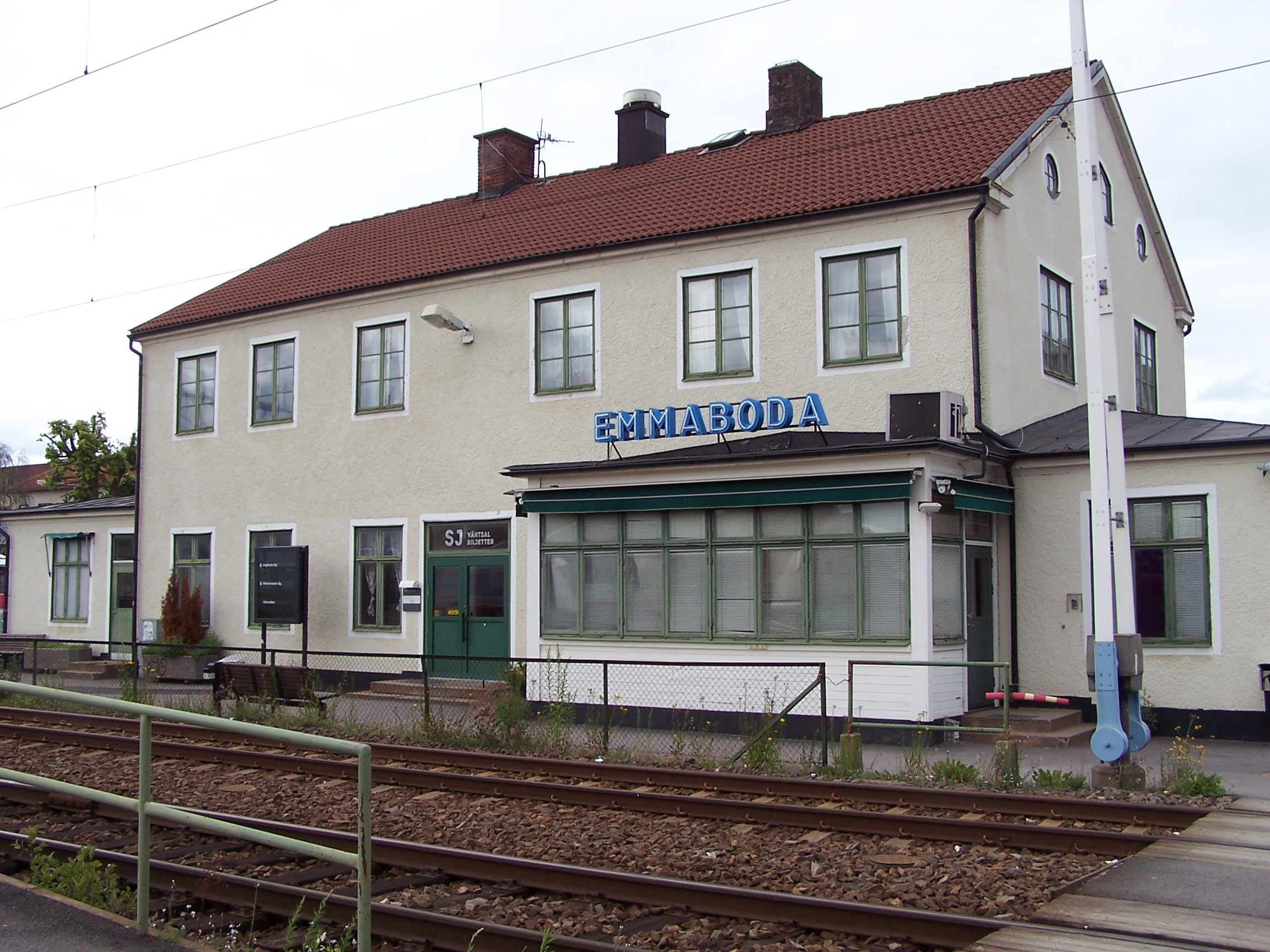
- Emmaboda railway station

- Coat of arms

- Location within Kalmar Location within Sweden
- Coordinates: 56°37′N 15°33′E
- Country: Sweden
- Province: Småland
- County: Kalmar County
- Municipality: Emmaboda Municipality

Area
  - Total: 5.91 km^{2} (2.28 sq mi)

Population (31 December 2010)
  - Total: 4,824
  - Density: 816/km^{2} (2,110/sq mi)
- Time zone: UTC+1 (CET)
  - Summer (DST): UTC+2 (CEST)

Emmaboda is a locality and the seat of Emmaboda Municipality, Kalmar County, Sweden. It had 4,824 inhabitants in 2010.

== History ==
Until 1875, Emmaboda was called Gantesbo. Back then there were only two houses in Gantesbo, which both remain to this day. The houses are called Gantesbo A and Gantesbo B. One of the houses is located on Bökön located west of Emmaboda's sports ground. The second stands on a hill between Emmaboda parish hall and the Bjurbäck school. In 1874, Emmaboda railway station was established for the Coast-to-Coast Line (Kust till kust-banan) and in 1875 Karlskrona-Växjö railway was connected to the station in Emmaboda.

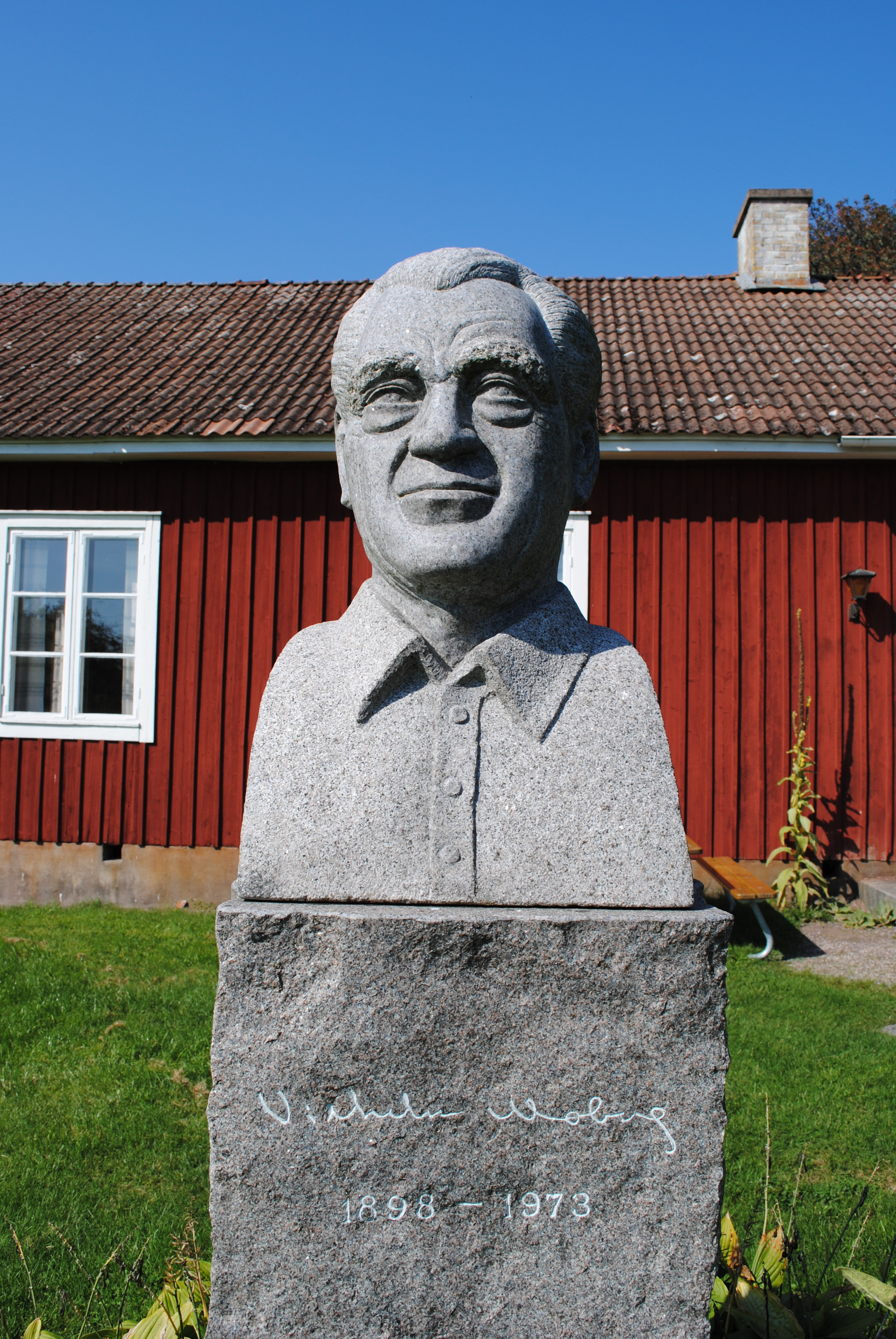
Bust of Vilhelm Moberg at Moshultamåla

== Culture ==
The musical "Kristina från Duvemåla" written by former members of the Swedish music group ABBA; Benny Andersson and Björn Ulvaeus, is a story based on a series of books by author Vilhelm Moberg (1898–1973). The Emigrants series was about people living in Dufvemåla homestead (which is 3 km outside of Emmaboda) who emigrated to the United States. Moberg was born in Emmaboda Municipality, more specifically at Moshultamåla in Algutsboda parish. Many of his novels were written about the people in the Emmaboda area.

"Emmabodafestivalen" was an indie-pop festival annually held in Emmaboda from 1988 until 2018, when the police announced they would not grant further permits to the festival due to drug use at the site. It attracted pop fans from all over Sweden. Other events taking place in Emmaboda include the car race "A Day On the Strip" and "End of Summer Big Power Meet", a classic car show which attracts veteran cars from all over Sweden and other Nordic countries.

== Geography ==
Emmaboda is located in the middle of the tri-city region of Växjö, Kalmar and Karlskrona. All three places are 60 kilometers from Emmaboda.

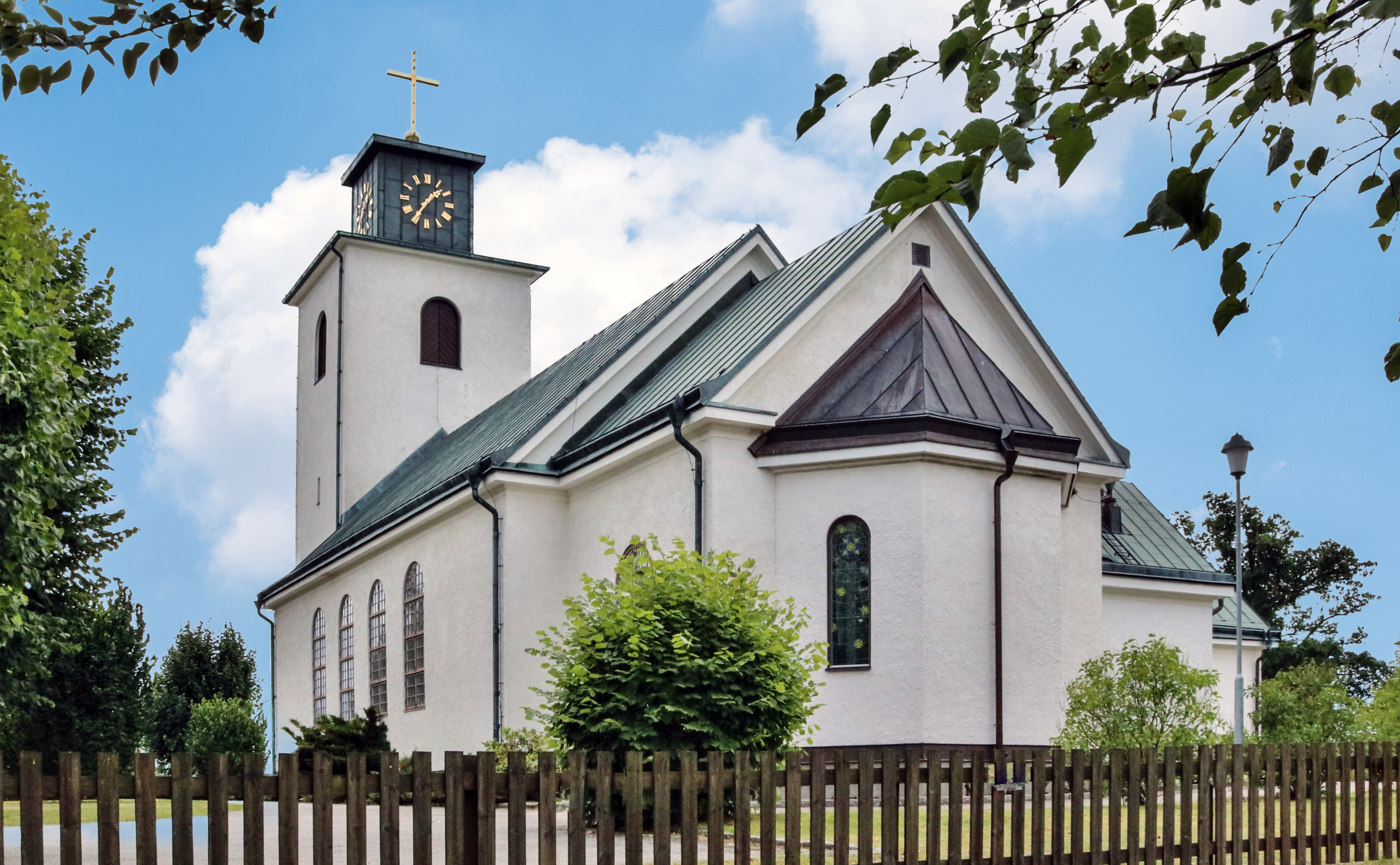
Emmaboda Church

== Emmaboda Church ==
Emmaboda Church (Emmaboda kyrka) was built in 1926 after drawings by architect Göran Pauli (1891–1940) and was originally a parish home. In 1941, a remodeling was carried out, after drawings by architect Paul Boberg (1884-1947) when the parish home was converted to church. The tower and the current choir party were then added. The altarpiece is painted by artist Gunnar Theander (1894-1975) in 1935. The bell tower houses two bells which were cast by the foundry, Bergholtz klockgjuteri.

== Sports ==
There is a football club called Emmaboda IS, with women's and men's teams in the 2nd respectively 3rd division. The three football brothers Viktor, David and Rasmus Elm are from the village Broakulla, which is located near Emmaboda.

Badminton player Henri Hurskainen, who has represented Sweden in the Summer Olympics and won various international medals, was born in Emmaboda.

== Industry ==
Emmaboda has two large companies, Xylem Water Solutions (located on the brink of Linde) and Emmaboda Glass Works (Emmaboda Glasverk) which was founded in 1919. Emmaboda also has many medium-sized businesses.
