= Avaskär =

- Village
- Location in Blekinge County
- Coordinates: 56°15′48.84″N 16°2′7.92″E
- Country: Sweden
- County: Blekinge County
- Municipality: Karlskrona Municipality
- Time zone: UTC+1 (CET)
  - Summer (DST): UTC+2 (CEST)

Avaskär is a village, with chapel and cemetery, in Kristianopel parish in eastern Blekinge in Sweden.

The city is mentioned first in 1350 and existed until 1600, when the city together with Lyckå lost its city charter in favor of the newly fortress city Kristianopel. During the 14th century, the Danes re-conquered Blekinge. Avaskär's history is not very well known since the King Valdemar IV of Denmark (1320–137) is said to have destroyed all the documents from this period.

During the Middle Ages, Avaskär was one of Denmark's smallest cities, located only six kilometers from the Swedish border. The city suffered from numerous depredations and fires during the regular Swedish-Danish wars of the 15th and 16th centuries. In 1451, King Charles VIII of Sweden (1408-1470) and King Christian I of Denmark (1426–1481) met in Avaskär to resolve a conflict. Denmark and Sweden had been at war since 1449 over which country had the right to Gotland. No significant resolve was reached as a result of this meeting.

During the Nordic Seven Years' War, the town was burned down by Swedes on 15 September 1563. The city was rebuilt, but its heyday was over. In 1598, Sigismund III Vasa (1566–1632) arrived with his fleet to Avaskär and traveled from there to Kalmar to assert his right to the throne of Sweden (see War against Sigismund). The following year, King Christian IV of Denmark decided to found a better fortified town named Kristianopel, and the name Avaskär receded from history.
