= Lyckeby BTK =

Table tennis club in Lyckeby, Sweden

- Full name: Lyckeby bordtennisklubb
- Sport: table tennis
- Founded: 16 December 1946
- Team history: Lösens BTK (1946-1995)
- Based in: Karlskrona, Sweden
- Arena: Vedebyhallen

Lyckeby BTK is a table tennis club in Lyckeby in Karlskrona, Sweden. Established on 16 December 1946, the club won the Swedish national women's team championship in 1994 and 1997. Up to 1995, the club was known as Lösens BTK.
