= Bertil Vallien =

Swedish artist (born 1938)

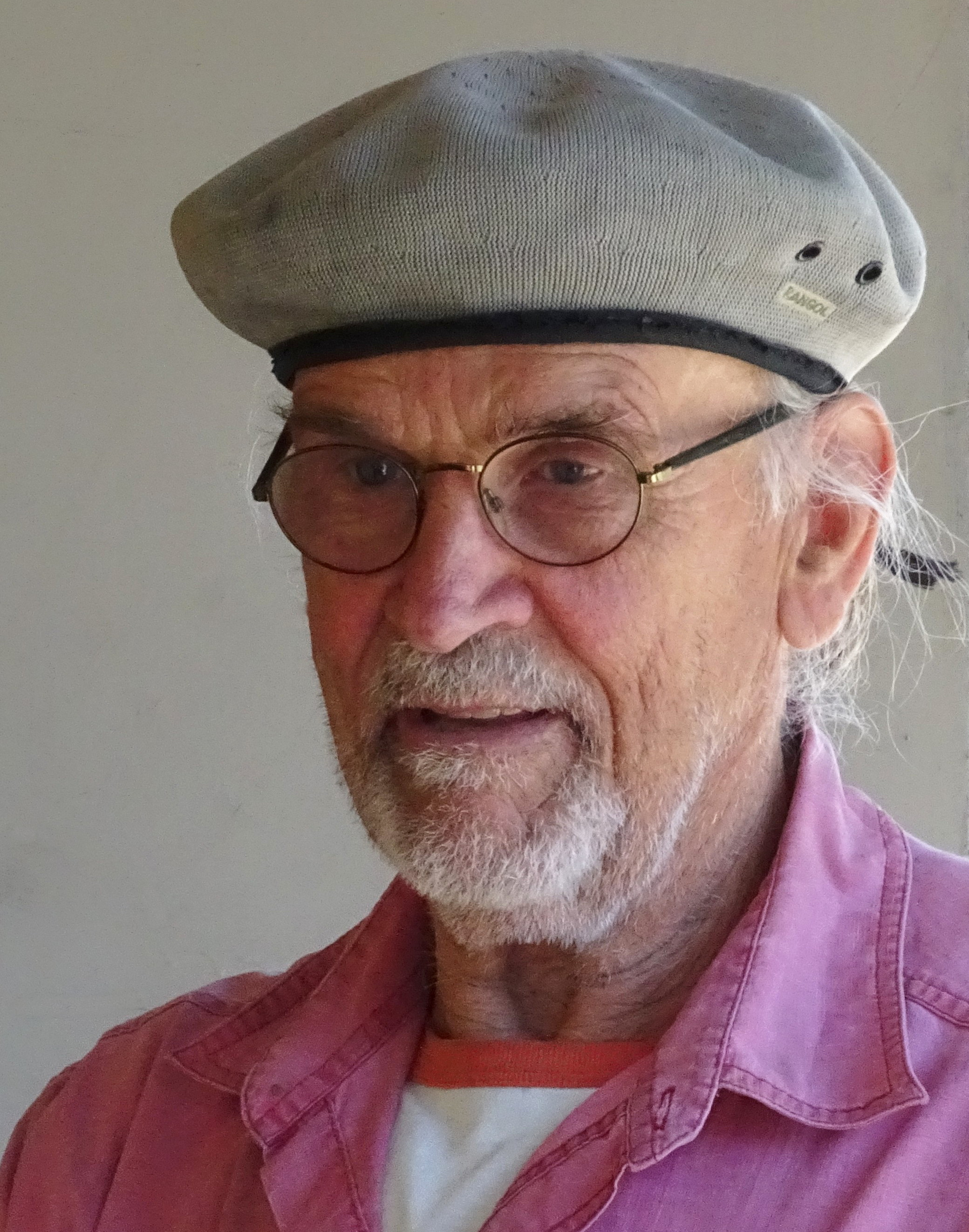
- Born: Erik Bertil Vallien; 17 January 1938 (age 88); Stockholm, Sweden

Erik Bertil Vallien (born Wallin, 17 January 1938) is a Swedish artist working mainly with sculpture, ceramics. glass art and design.

== Early life ==
Vallien is the son of painter and preacher Nils Wallin (1911–1987) and Astrid Wallin (née Andersson) (1908–1992). He grew up in Sollentuna north of Stockholm in a family of seven children.

== Career ==
Vallien worked as a decorator at the PUB department stora and as an apprentice painter at his fathers company, and at this time he decided he wanted to become an artist. He applied and got accepted into the art school Konstfack in 1956. After two years he decided to also study ceramics, where he graduated in 1961. He moved later to California and studied at University of Southern California in Los Angeles. This trip to America was possible after he received a scholarship from the Kungafonden and H. Ax:son Johnsons stiftelse. Vallien returned to Sweden in 1963.

After returning to Sweden, Vallien got employment at Boda glasbruk, and started working as a glass artist and designer for the companies 100-year anniversary, by 2012 he was still working within the trade but at Kosta Boda glass factory.

Vallien is an honorary doctor at Växjö University.

He had exhibitions of his work in Los Angeles in 1962 and 1963. At Bonniers in New York. Along with his wife Ulrica Hydman Vallien, he had exhibitions in Värnamo. He also appeared in the exhibition Young Americans which was shown at Museum of Contemporary Crafts in New York in 1962.

== Personal life ==
He was married to fellow artist Ulrica Hydman Vallien between 1963 and her death in 2018.
