= Sven Lindgren =

Swedish politician and civil servant

Sven Lindgren (born 1946) is a former Moderate Party politician and former Governor of Kalmar County, Sweden,.

He was born in Västervik and later pursued an academic career at Linköping University. He was later elected Leader of the Opposition on Linköping Municipal Council. Between 1991 and 1994 he led a non-socialist administration in the city. After losing the 1994 election, Lindgren returned to leading the opposition. Between 2002 and 2009, he served as Governor of Kalmar County. Lindgren is chairperson of the Swedish Civil Protection Association.

He is married to Anna Lindgren, a Moderate Party member of the Riksdag.
