= Peter Jablonski =

Swedish concert pianist (born 1971)

Peter Jablonski (born 1971) is a Swedish concert pianist.

== Biography ==
Peter Jablonski was born in Lyckeby, Sweden to a Swedish mother and Polish father. He studied percussion and piano at Malmö Conservatory from 1982 to 1986. He performed as a drummer at the Village Vanguard jazz club in New York at the age of nine. He debuted as a pianist in Sweden at the age of 12, with Mozart concerto k 453. In 1989 he moved to the United Kingdom. There he studied composition, conducting and piano at the Royal College of Music in London. He signed to Decca Records in 1991, with a debut recording of Gershwin's piano concerto in F with the Royal Philharmonic Orchestra and Vladimir Ashkenazy, followed by Rachmaninoff's Rhapsody on a Theme of Paganini, Lutoslawski's Paganini Variations, and Shostakovich's concerto no.1 for piano and trumpet, again with the RPO and Ashkenazy - for which he won an Edison award. With Ashkenazy he also recorded Scriabin's "Prometheus" and piano concerto with the Deutsches Symphonie-Orchester Berlin. He later recorded Tchaikovsky's second and third piano concertos with the Philharmonia Orchestra and Charles Dutoit and Tchaikovsky's first piano concerto with Peter Maag. Other recordings include the complete piano sonatas by Prokofiev, and albums dedicated to Chopin, Liszt, Mussorgsky, Mozart, Stravinsky, Szymanowski and Grieg. He made his debuts at Washington's Kennedy Center in 1992 and at London's Royal Festival Hall in 1993. In 2008 he made his conducting debut with the Cracow Philharmonic Orchestra in Sibelius Symphony nr 1.

Washington Post wrote about Jablonski: "It may happen once a season or once in a lifetime. Along comes a talent, not merely your run-of-the-mill virtuoso, but someone, something extraordinary that makes you rethink a piece of music you thought you've known forever".

In 2020, Jablonski released his debut album for Ondine Records, Scriabin's complete Mazurkas, to great critical acclaim.

In 2021, Jablonski's recording of the works by a Russian composer Alexey Stanchinsky, also for Ondine, has been warmly accepted both by audiences and critics, earning him the Gramophone Editor's Choice in May 2021. It has been listed among the best classical releases of the year by the Gramophone.

In 2022, the artist embarked on his project of performing and recording the piano music of Grażyna Bacewicz (1909-1969), who takes her place among major Polish composers of her generation. 'Jablonski plays Bacewicz' recording was released on Ondine in February 2022, and immediately received the Gramophone Editor's Choice in March 2022, and was later included in the publication's best releases of the year list. Patrick Rucker's review concluded that the release introduced '...Music by important woman composer, played by a pianist in full flower of his mature, imaginative artistry.'

'Jablonski plays Bacewicz' became the BBC Music Magazine Instrumental Choice in March 2022, and Critics' Choice in The Record Geijutsu, Japan, in April 2022.

Gramophone listed the recording among its best classical recordings, and best piano recordings of 2022.

In December 2022, Jablonski's Bacewicz recording was awarded the French Academy Charles Cros Award.

In January 2023, it was nominated for The BBC Music Magazine Awards 2023.

Peter Jablonski is an ambassador for DONNE Foundation, a charity dedicated to promoting and supporting the work of women in music.

In May 2022, Peter Jablonski became a member of the Swedish Royal Music Academy.

== Awards ==
- Edison Award for recording of the Rhapsody on a theme of Paganini by Rachmaninov with the [Royal Philharmonic Orchestra] and [Vladimir Ashkenazy].
- International Swede of the Year 1996.
- Warsaw Autumn Festival 1998 Orpheus Award for his premiere performance of Kilar's Piano Concerto.
- Litteris et Artibus Medal in June 2005 for his achievement as a pianist.
- The French Academy Charles Cros Award for the recording of piano music by Grażyna Bacewicz, December 2022.
- The Swedish Grammy Award, Årets Klassiska 2025, for the recording of Ronald Stevenson's piano works, April 2025.

The Fryderyk Award 2026 in category Most Outstanding Polish Music Recording, for his interpretation of André Tchaikowsky's two piano concertos and piano sonata. The recording was made with the NOSPR (Polish National Radio Symphony Orchestra) and conductor Łukasz Borowicz, and released on Ondine in November 2025.
