= Ulrica Hydman Vallien =

Swedish artist (1938–2018)

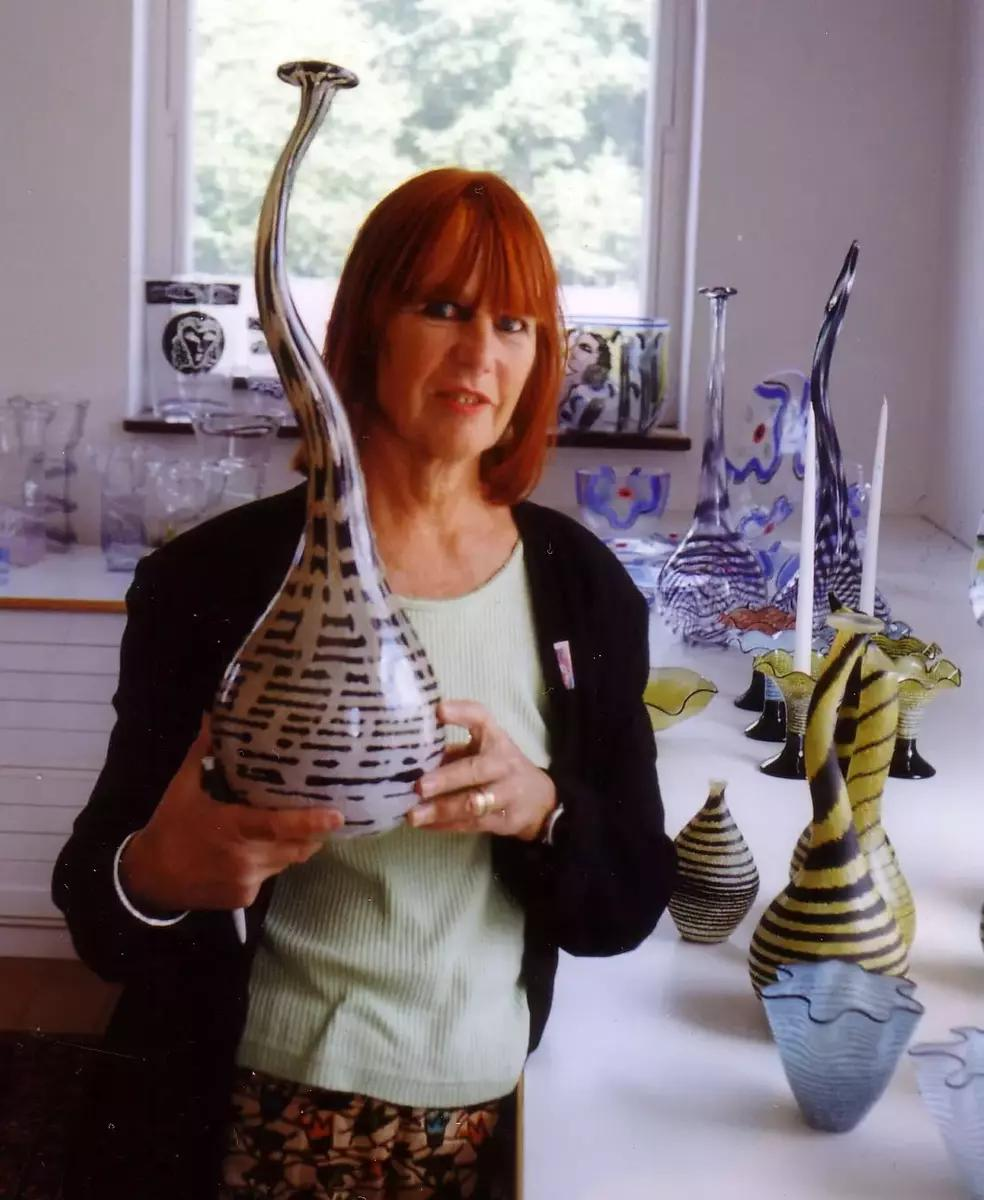
- Ulrica Hydman-Vallien in 1999
- Born: March 24, 1938
- Died: March 21, 2018 (aged 79); Eriksmåla, Sweden
- Spouse: Bertil Vallien (m. 1963)

Ulrica Margareta Hydman Vallien (24 March 1938 – 21 March 2018) was a Swedish artist who specialized in stained glass and decorative painting. In Sweden, she became best known for her vases with motifs of sinuous snakes, tulips and wolves.

== Work ==
Ulrica Hydman Vallien was the daughter of Stig Johan Hydman and Margit Billberg-Johansson, and lived in Algutsboda. She made her debut as a glass-artist in 1972. As a protest against the conservative artist world she created the "rat bowl". Hydman Vallien was one of only 50 artists chosen to work with British Airways to create designs for aircraft tails, napkins, porcelain, tickets and stationery for the fleet. She also took part in the Swedish National Museum exhibition Unga tecknare 1964–1966.

Hydman Vallien's work can be seen at Nationalmuseum, Moderna Museet, Kalmar Konstmuseum, the Indianapolis Museum of Art, the Victoria and Albert Museum, the University of Michigan Museum of Art, the Chrysler Museum of Art, the Museum of Applied Arts and Sciences, the Detroit Institute of Arts, and Göteborgs Konstmuseum.

== Works, a selection ==
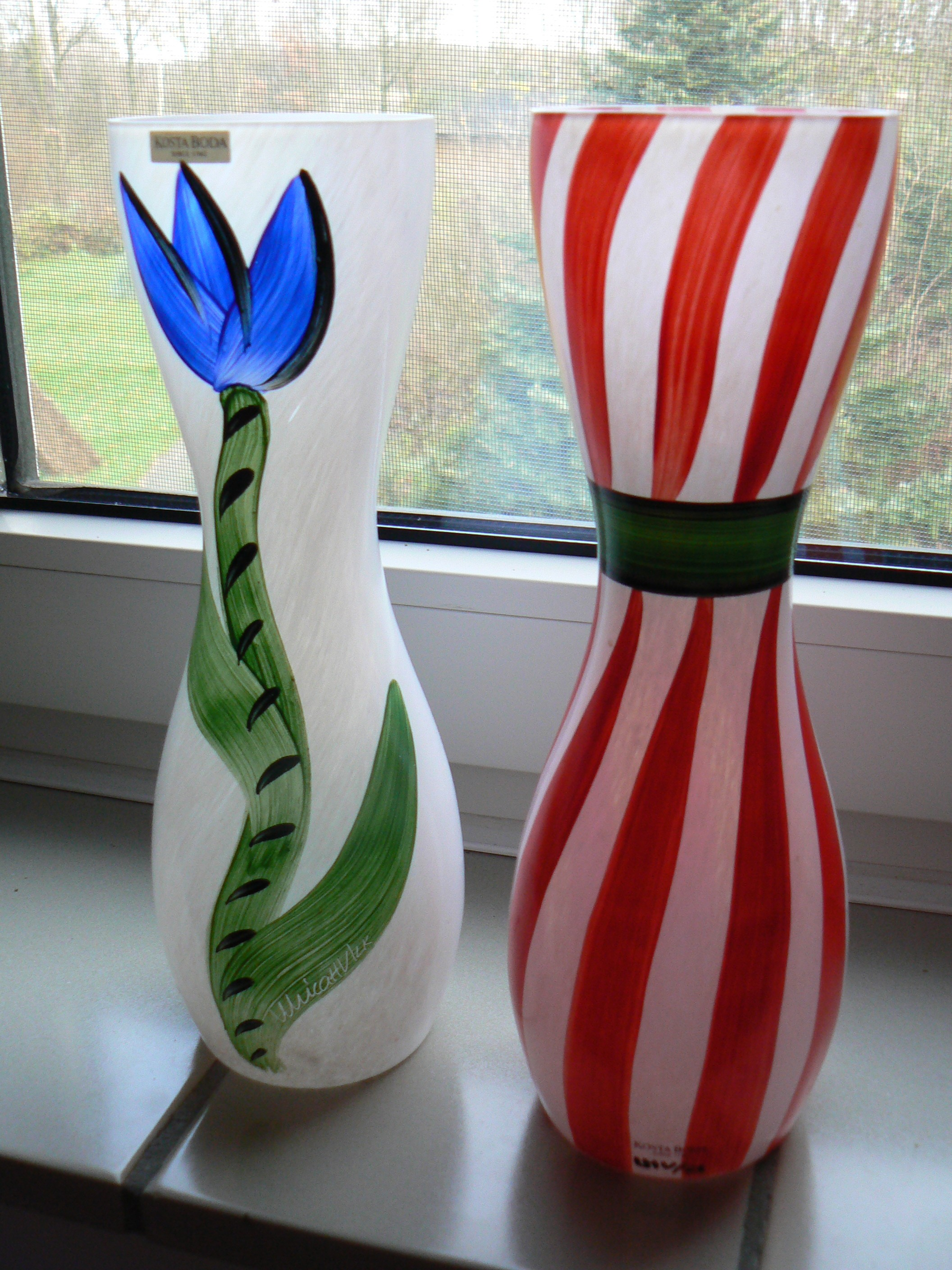
Tulip vases

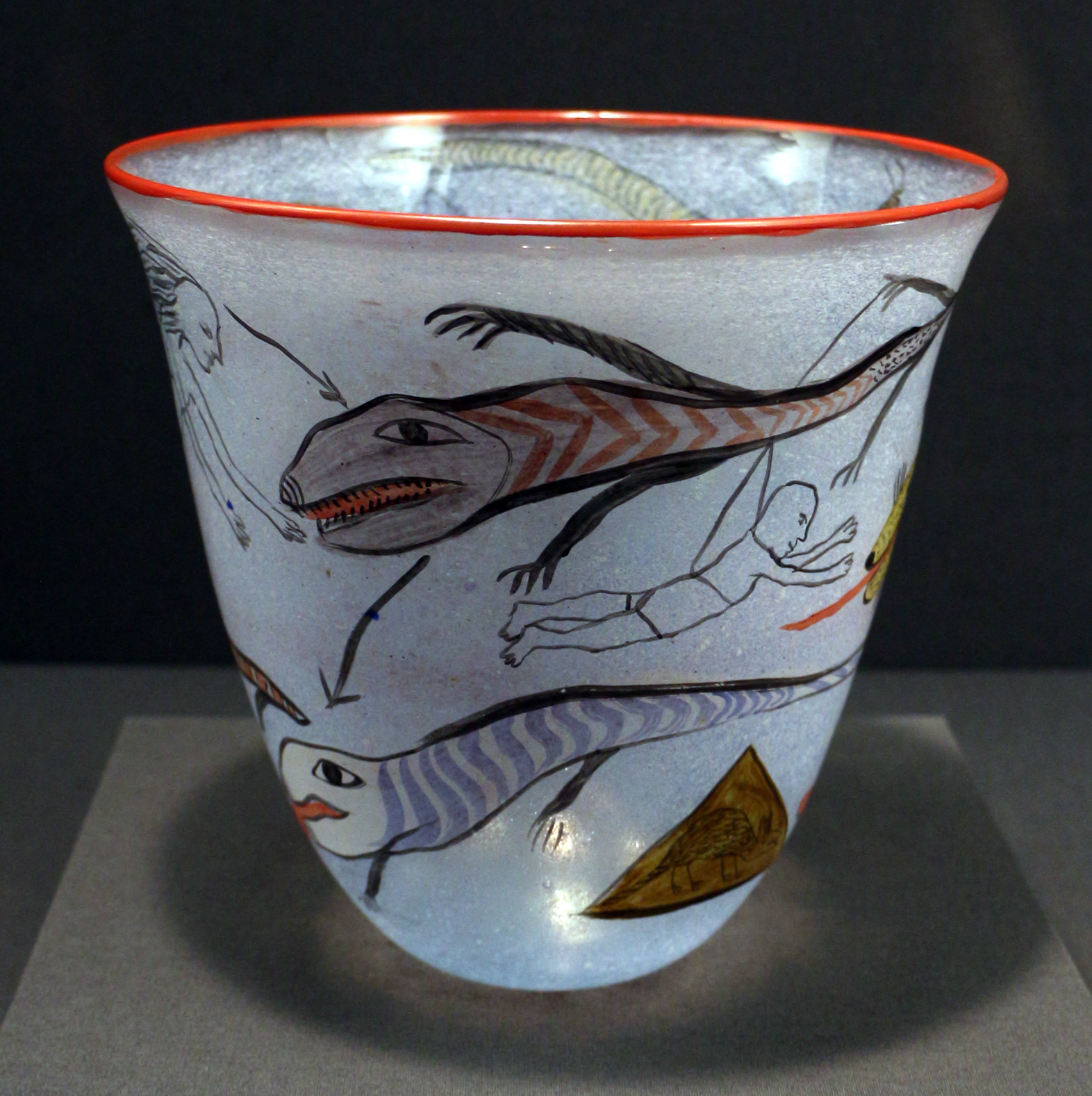
Vase created in 1978

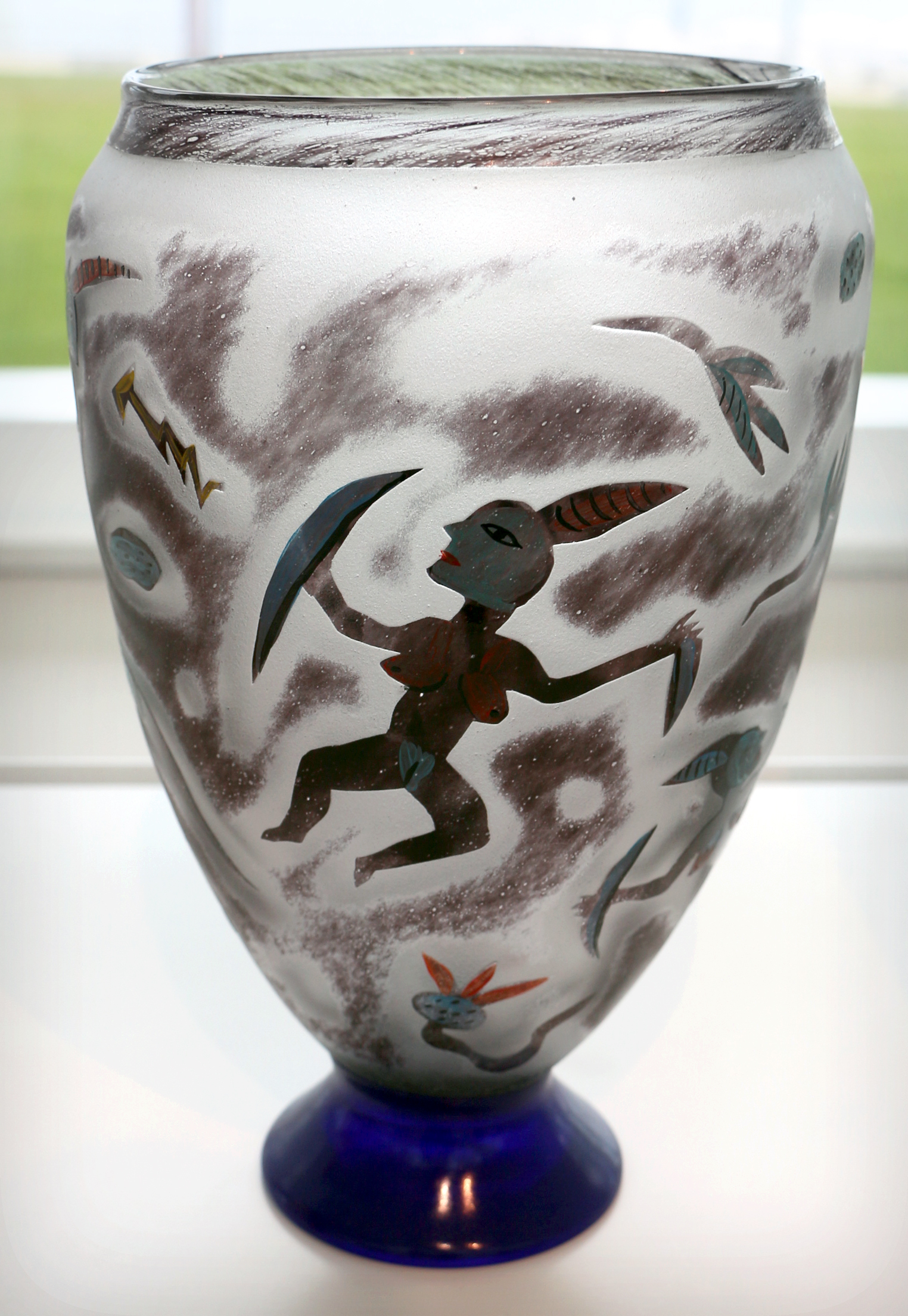
Spirits Vase, 1986

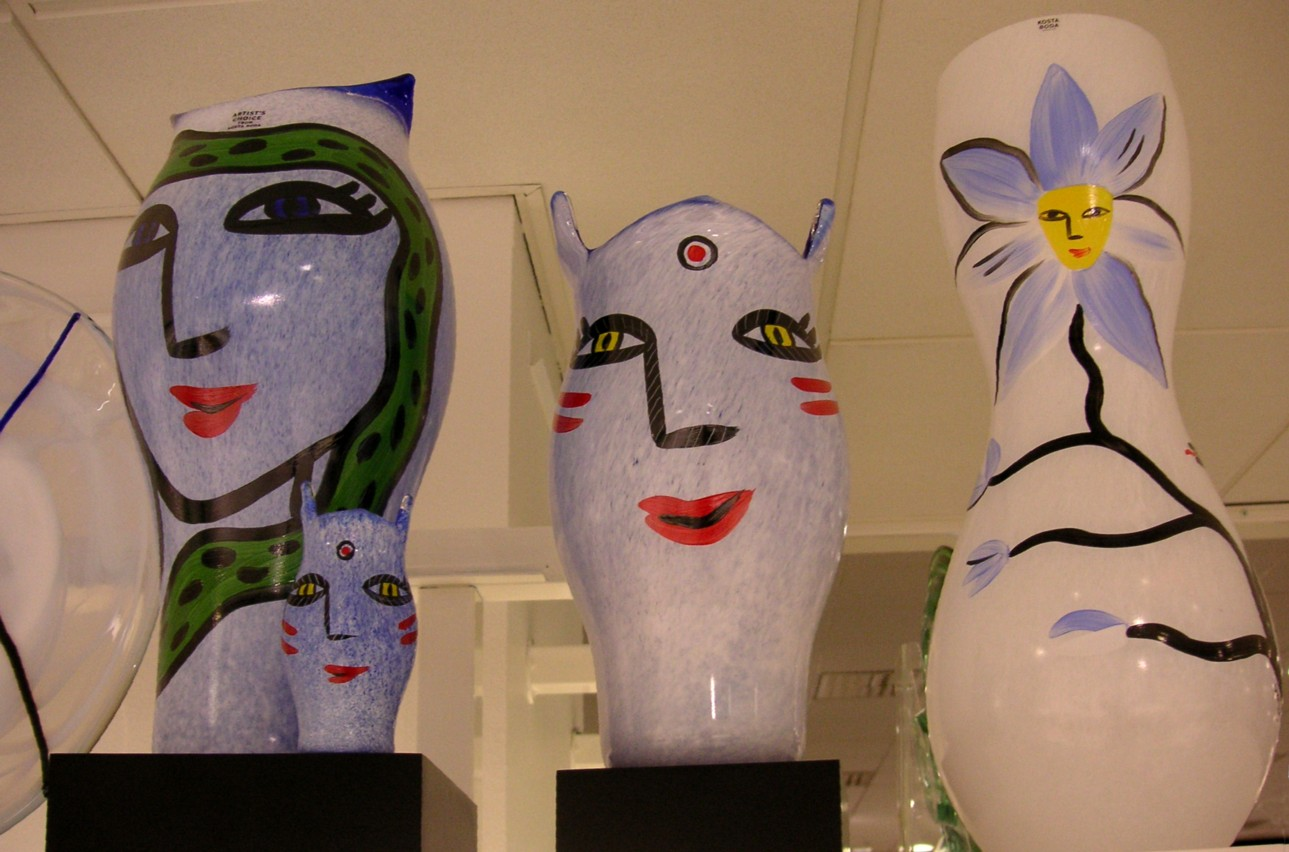
Vases Open Mind, 1986

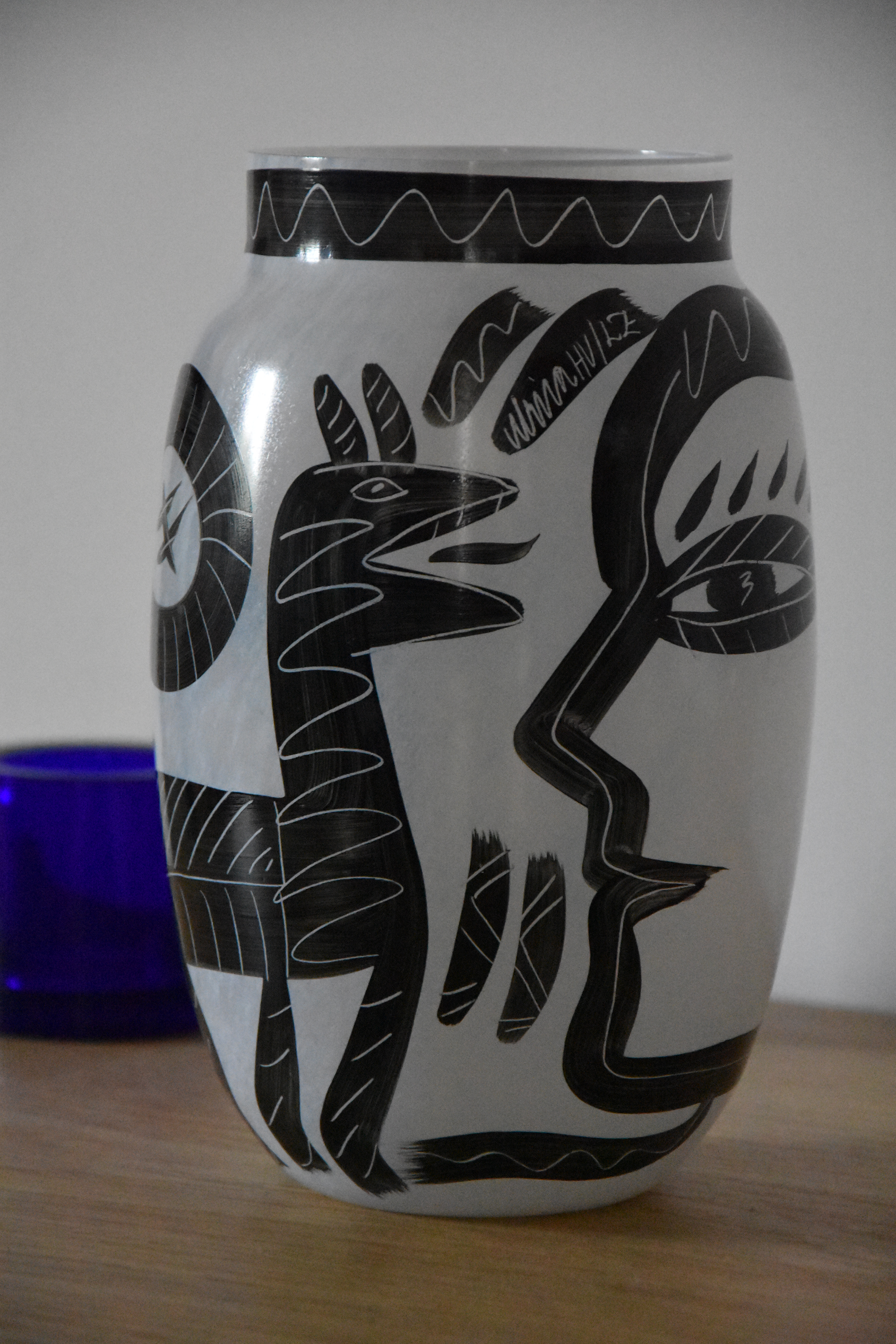
Caramba! vase, 2001

== Personal life ==
She was married to fellow artist Bertil Vallien between 1963 and her death in 2018.

== Tributes ==
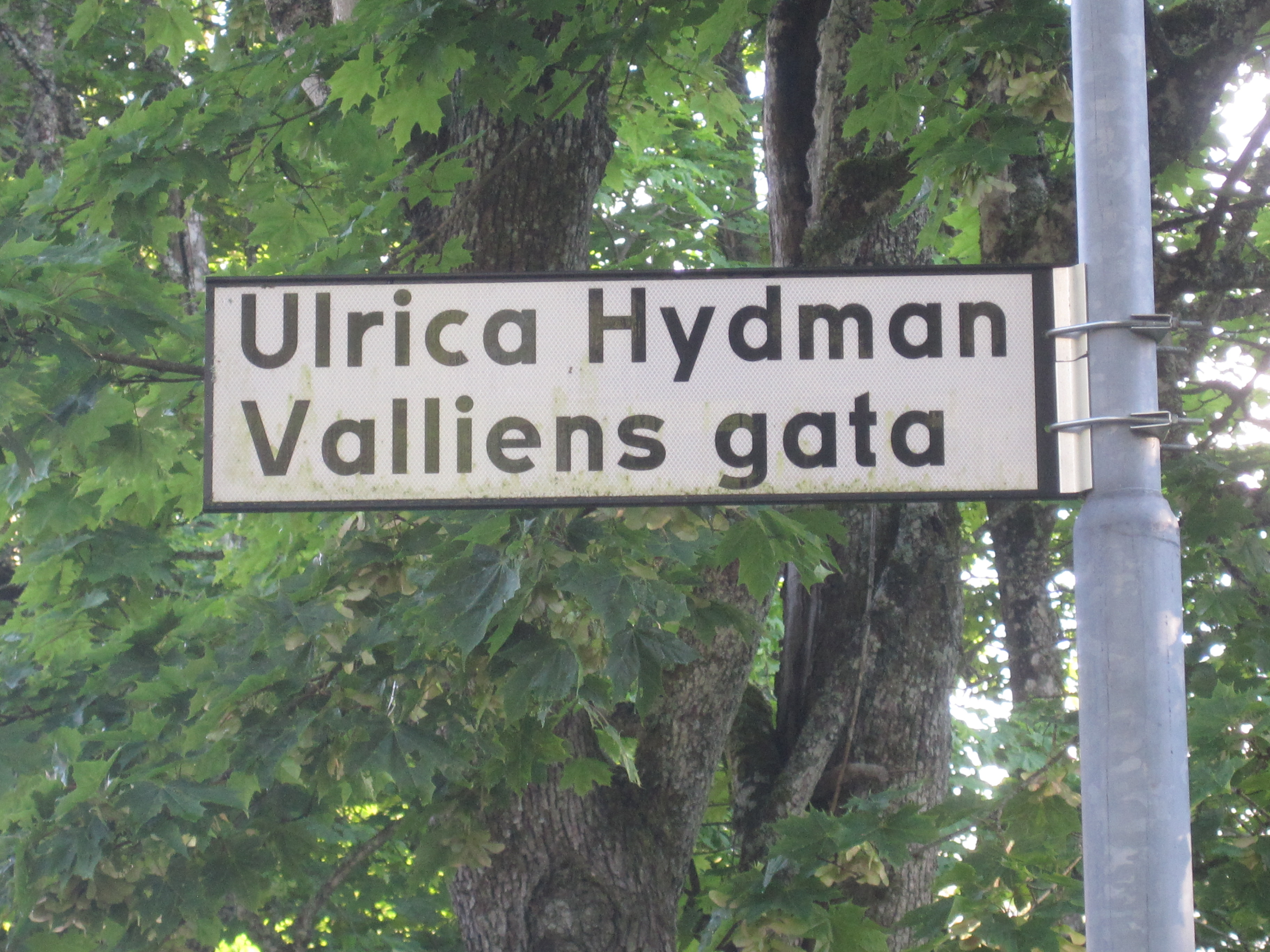
Ulrica Hydman Vallien gata, a street named after the artist in Åfors, Sweden

As a tribute, Ulrica Hydman Valliens gata is a street named after her in Åfors, Sweden. She died in Eriksmåla on 21 March 2018, three days before her 80th birthday.

== Books ==
- Svenskt konstnärslexikon part V, pages 576, Allhems Förlag, Malmö. Libris post 8390293
- Alfons Hannes Die Sammlung Wolfgang Kermer, Glasmuseum Frauenau: Glas des 20. Jahrhunderts; 50er bis 70er Jahre. Schnell & Steiner, München, Zürich, 1989 (= Bayerische Museen; 9) ISBN 3-7954-0753-2, Pages. 113–114.
