= Lyckeby GoIF =

Swedish football club

- Full name: Lyckeby Gymnastik Och Idrottsförening
- Founded: 1925; 100 years ago
- Dissolved: 2012; 13 years ago
- Ground: Lyckåvallen; Lyckeby; Sweden
- Chairman: Bosse Lindström
- League: Division 3 Sydöstra Götaland
- 2011: Division 3 Sydöstra Götaland, 2nd
Home colours	Away colours

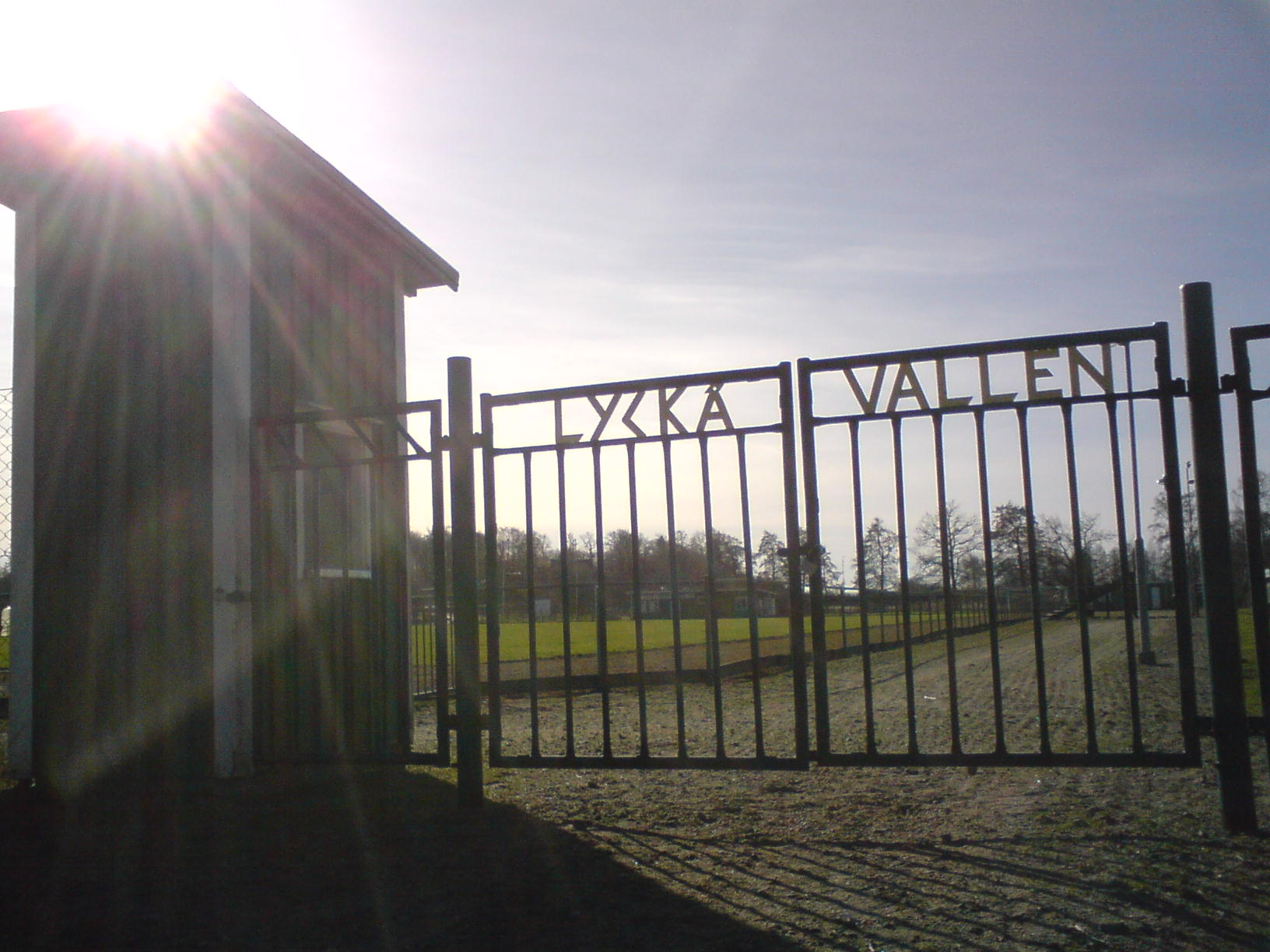
Lyckåvallen

Lyckeby GoIF was a Swedish football club located in Lyckeby in Karlskrona Municipality, Blekinge County. The club merged with Karlskrona AIF in 2012 to form FK Karlskrona.

== Background ==
Lyckeby GoIF (Gymnastik- och Idrottsförening) was a sports club which was founded on 5 February 1925. There were around 40 young sports enthusiasts who wanted a local club that would involve young people in sports such as tennis, swimming, winter sports, wrestling and football.

Since their foundation Lyckeby GoIF has participated mainly in the middle divisions of the Swedish football league system. The club played their home matches at the Lyckåvallen in Lyckeby. Since 1995 the clubhouse has been located at Lyckåvallen where there are four football fields, six changing rooms, a cafe and various storage sheds.

Lyckeby GoIF were affiliated to Blekinge Fotbollförbund.

== Recent history ==
In recent seasons Lyckeby GoIF have competed in the following divisions:

- 2011 – Division III, Sydöstra Götaland
- 2010 – Division III, Sydöstra Götaland
- 2009 – Division III, Sydöstra Götaland
- 2008 – Division IV, Blekinge
- 2007 – Division IV, Blekinge
- 2006 – Division IV, Blekinge
- 2005 – Division IV, Blekinge
- 2004 – Division IV, Blekinge
- 2003 – Division IV, Blekinge
- 2002 – Division IV, Blekinge
- 2001 – Division IV, Blekinge
- 2000 – Division IV, Blekinge
- 1999 – Division IV, Blekinge

== Attendances ==
In recent seasons Lyckeby GoIF have had the following average attendances:

Season	Average attendance	Division / Section	Level
2008	Not available	Div 4 Blekinge	Tier 6
2009	198	Div 3 Sydöstra Götaland	Tier 5
2010	185	Div 3 Sydöstra Götaland	Tier 5
2011	TBD	Div 3 Sydöstra Götaland	Tier 5

* Attendances are provided in the Publikliga sections of the Svenska Fotbollförbundet website.
