= Johansfors =

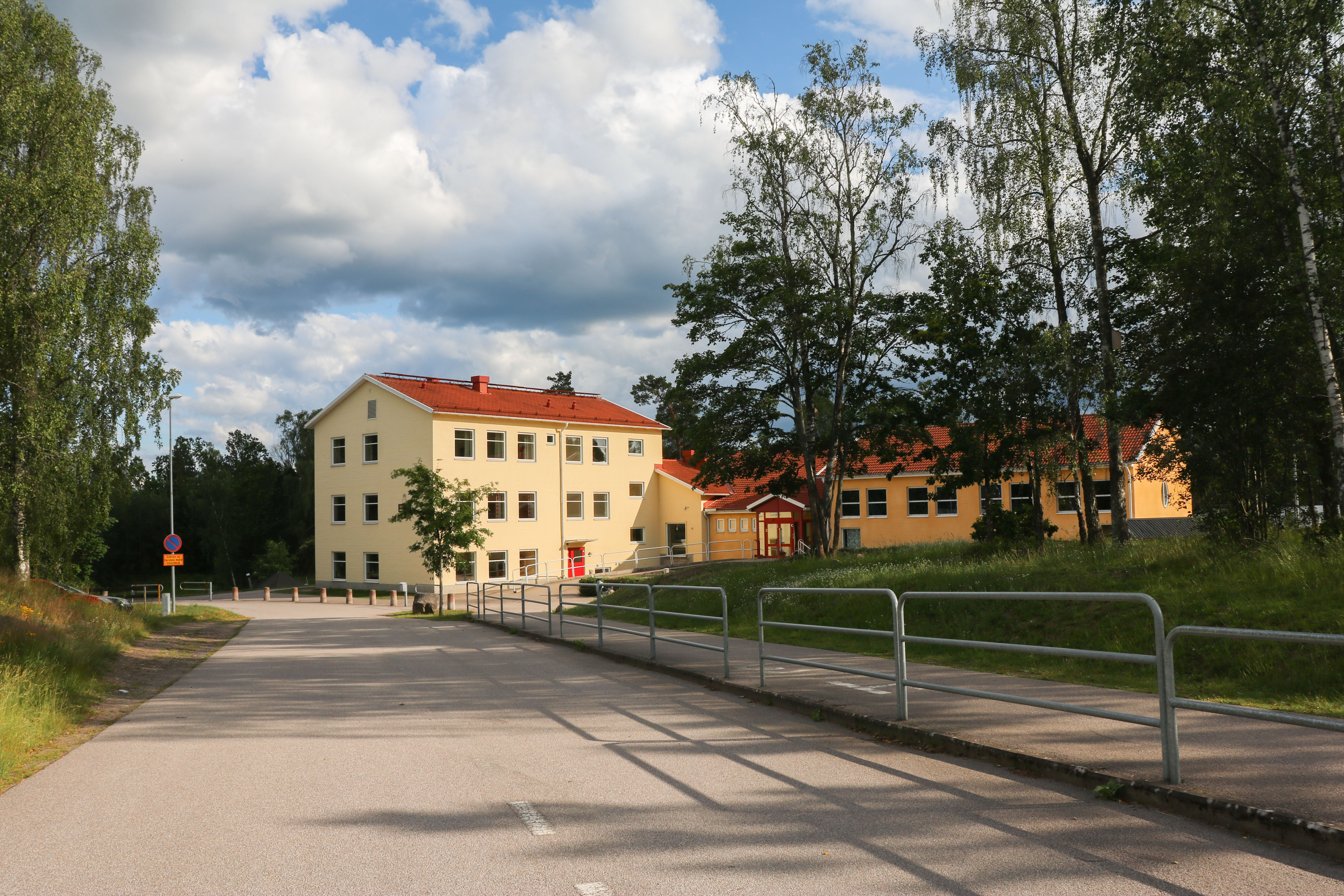

- Location within Kalmar Location within Sweden
- Coordinates: 56°42′N 15°32′E
- Country: Sweden
- Province: Småland
- County: Kalmar County
- Municipality: Emmaboda Municipality

Area
  - Total: 1.14 km^{2} (0.44 sq mi)

Population (31 December 2010)
  - Total: 409
  - Density: 360/km^{2} (930/sq mi)
- Time zone: UTC+1 (CET)
  - Summer (DST): UTC+2 (CEST)

Johansfors is a locality situated in Emmaboda Municipality, Kalmar County, Sweden with 409 inhabitants in 2010.

The Johansfors Glasbruk was a long-established glassworks known for its glass production before its closure.
