= Eriksmåla =

- Location within Kalmar Location within Sweden
- Coordinates: 56°44′N 15°28′E
- Country: Sweden
- Province: Småland
- County: Kalmar County
- Municipality: Emmaboda Municipality

Area
  - Total: 0.94 km^{2} (0.36 sq mi)

Population (31 December 2010)
  - Total: 231
  - Density: 246/km^{2} (640/sq mi)
- Time zone: UTC+1 (CET)
  - Summer (DST): UTC+2 (CEST)

Eriksmåla is a locality situated in Emmaboda Municipality, Kalmar County, Sweden with 231 inhabitants in 2010.
