= Boda glasbruk =

Boda Glasbruk
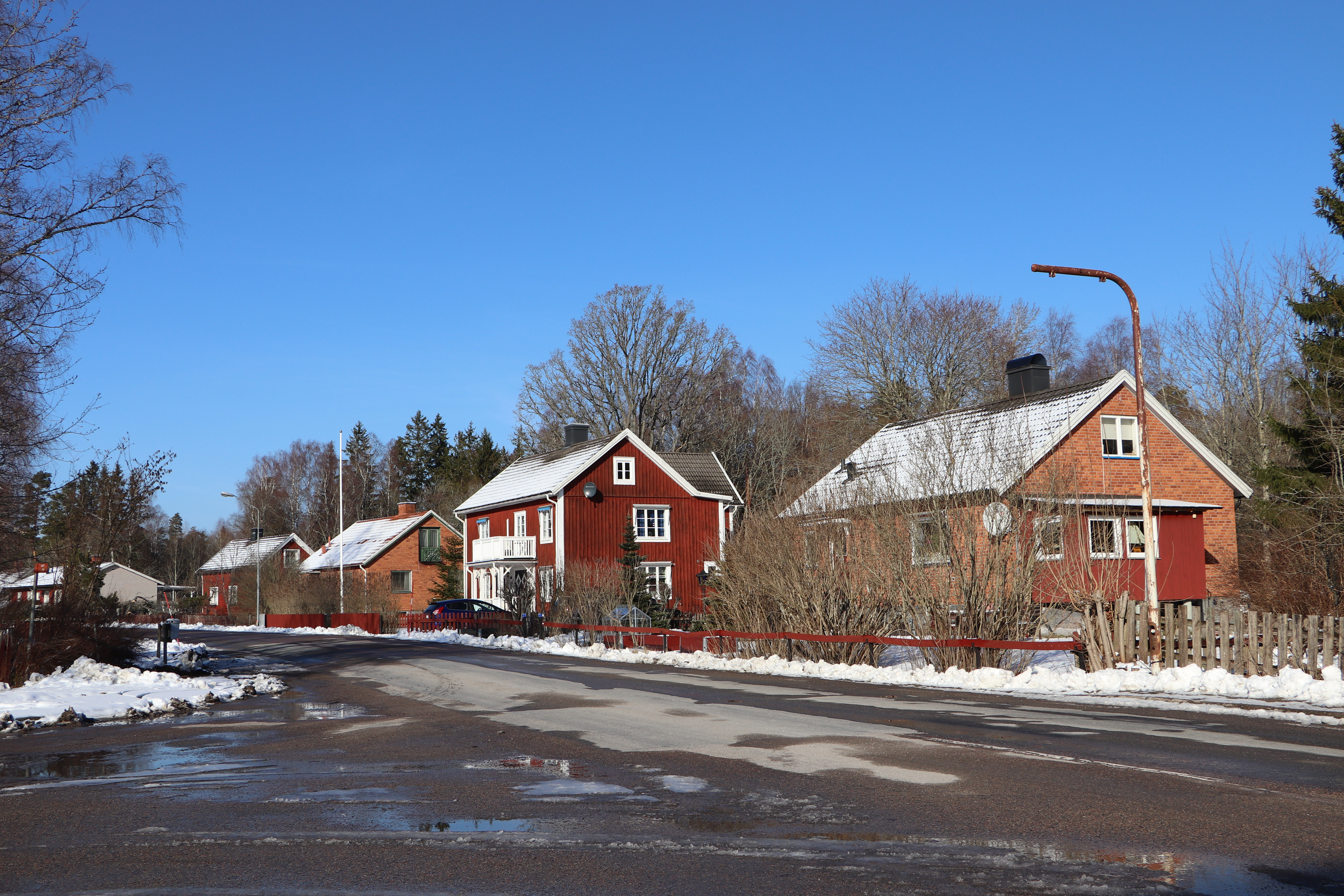

- Location within Kalmar Location within Sweden
- Coordinates: 56°43′N 15°44′E
- Country: Sweden
- Province: Småland
- County: Kalmar County
- Municipality: Emmaboda Municipality

Area
  - Total: 0.44 km^{2} (0.17 sq mi)

Population (2005-12-31)
  - Total: 201
  - Density: 453/km^{2} (1,170/sq mi)
- Time zone: UTC+1 (CET)
  - Summer (DST): UTC+2 (CEST)

Boda Glasbruk is a village situated in Emmaboda Municipality, Kalmar County, Sweden. It had 201 inhabitants in 2005.

One of the glassworks of Kosta Boda are situated here. The village was renamed from Förlångskvarn when the glassworks opened in 1874.
