= Kristianopel =

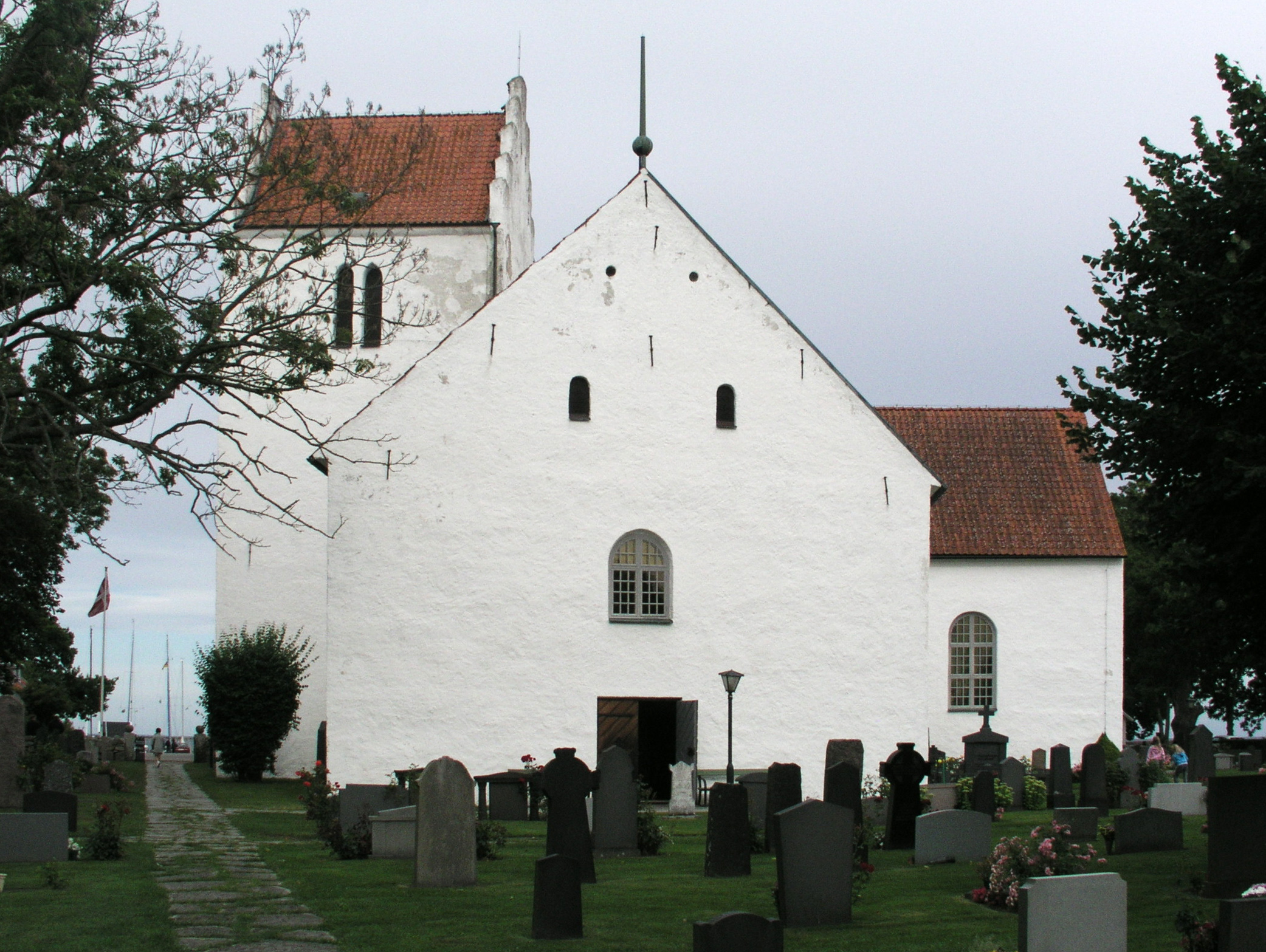
- Kristianopel Church in August 2005

- Coat of arms

- Location within Blekinge Location within Sweden
- Coordinates: 56°15′24″N 16°02′33″E
- Country: Sweden
- Municipality: Karlskrona Municipality
- County: Blekinge County
- Province: Blekinge
- Founded: 1603
- Charter: 1622

Kristianopel (Swedish pronunciation: [krɪstɪaˈnǔːpɛl]) is a village in Karlskrona Municipality in the southeastern Swedish region of Blekinge. In 2015 it had a population of 88.

== History of the town ==
Flint finds have been made at the site, which indicates that there have been Stone Age settlements here.

Kristianopel is located in the easternmost part of Blekinge, which was the easternmost part of Denmark in beginning of the 17th century. The town of Avaskär, located just a few hundred metres north of present-day Kristianopel, was too difficult to defend from Swedish attacks. The Danish king Christian IV had a fortress built south of it in 1603 and named it after his newborn son - Prince Christian (1603–1647) or Kristian, with Swedish spelling.

The Germanised Greek suffix '-opel' was given to give the town a cosmopolitan ring similar to Constantinople. Construction of the town was completed in 1606 and held approximately 700 inhabitants.

During the Kalmar War, prince Gustavus Adolphus of Sweden (1594 — 1632), took the town with a small force on 25 June 1611 and destroyed the supplies the Danes had stored there. The town was burned down and the church was demolished. The city privileges of Avaskär and neighboring Lyckå were transferred to Kristianopel in 1622, and the town was fortified in 1637. Lyckå Castle was demolished in order to use it as building material at Kristianopel.

Kristianopel Church (Kristianopels Kyrka) or Church of the Holy Trinity was rebuilt between 1618 and 1624. The building was retrieved limestone and granite from Öland and bricks from nearby Nättraby. It is the only preserved building from the time when Kristianopel was a fortified city and the last outpost of the Danish kingdom at the border to Sweden.

Kristianopel's significance as a frontier fortress vanished when Blekinge became Swedish as a consequence of the treaty of Roskilde in 1658. In 1676 the fortress' equipment was transferred to Karlshamn. On 25 September that year the abandoned fortress was taken by Danish lieutenant colonel Lützow, who began shoring up the partially demolished fortifications and made Kristianopel a strongpoint for the Snapphane guerrilla. Lützow was forced to yield Kristianopel on 22 February 1677, whereupon the fortress was razed to the ground and the burghers commanded to move to other towns. The town was declared dangerous to the security of Sweden, and in 1678 an order decreed that no building be left standing in Kristianopel. The remaining inhabitants were resettled in Ronneby, Växjö, and Karlshamn.

During the municipal reform of 1862, Kristianopel did not become its own municipality in köping, but was then part of Kristianopel's county municipality. However, the town continued to be called köping and gradually gained administrative rights equivalent to a municipal community, but was called municipal köping which remained until the end of 1923. In 1924, Kristianopel's municipal society was established in the county municipality, although it is unclear whether the city statutes were applied. In the census, Kristianopel is also not called a municipal society, but is called Kristianopel's köping. Kristianopel's distinctive status disappeared on 1 January 1952 (according to a decision on 14 December 1951) when the town was no longer counted as köping. At the same time, the town merged with the county municipality into Jämjö county municipality. This in turn amounted to Karlskrona municipality in 1974.

In 1890, Kristianopel had 137 inhabitants and in 1932 it had 102 inhabitants.

On 30 April 1981 a stampede took place in Kristianopel prior to a concert with Gyllene Tider. 3 people died as a result.

In October 2015 Karlskrona Municipality decided to open a refugee camp in Kristianopel, giving shelter to 80 people.

== Gallery ==
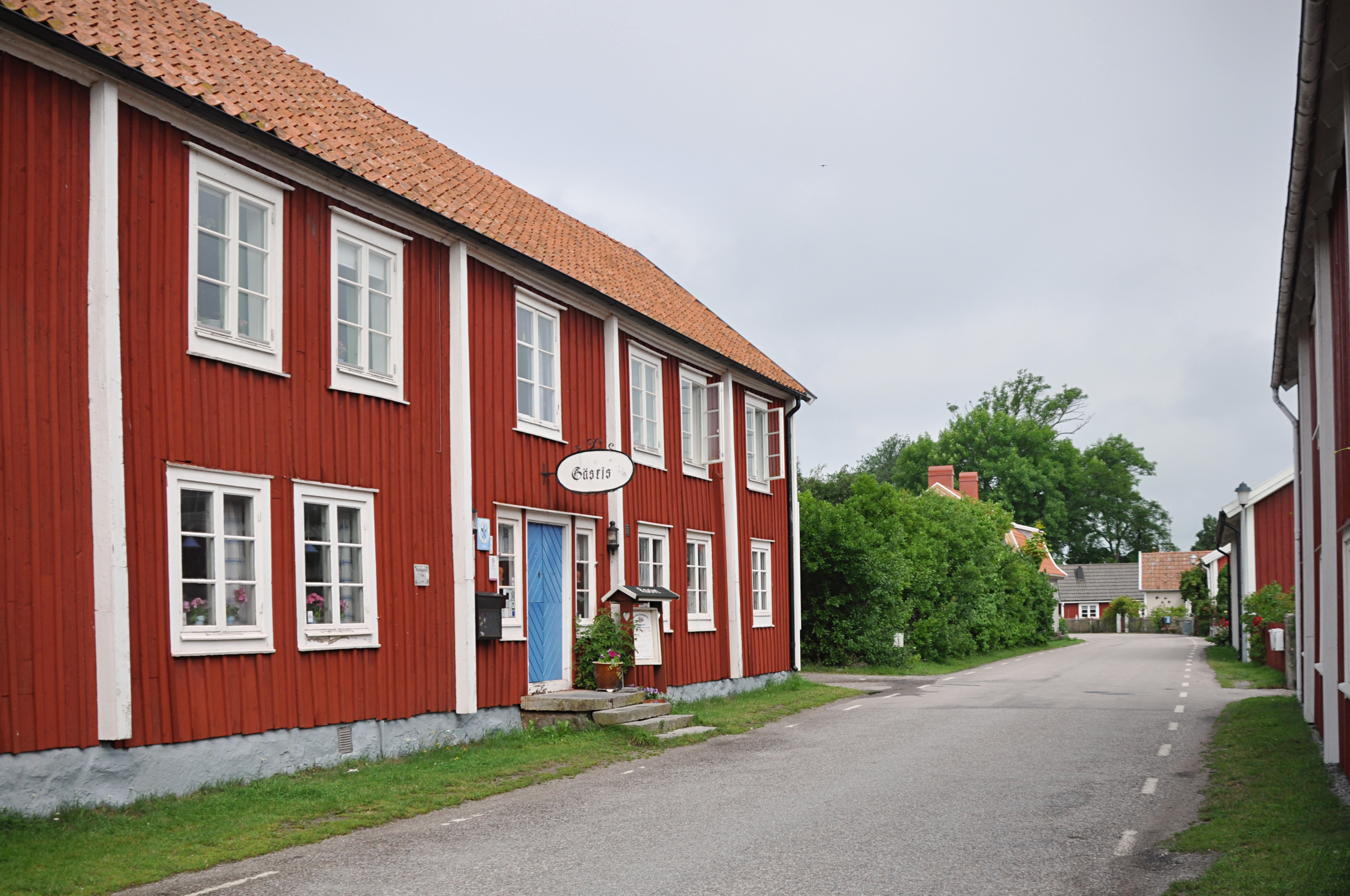

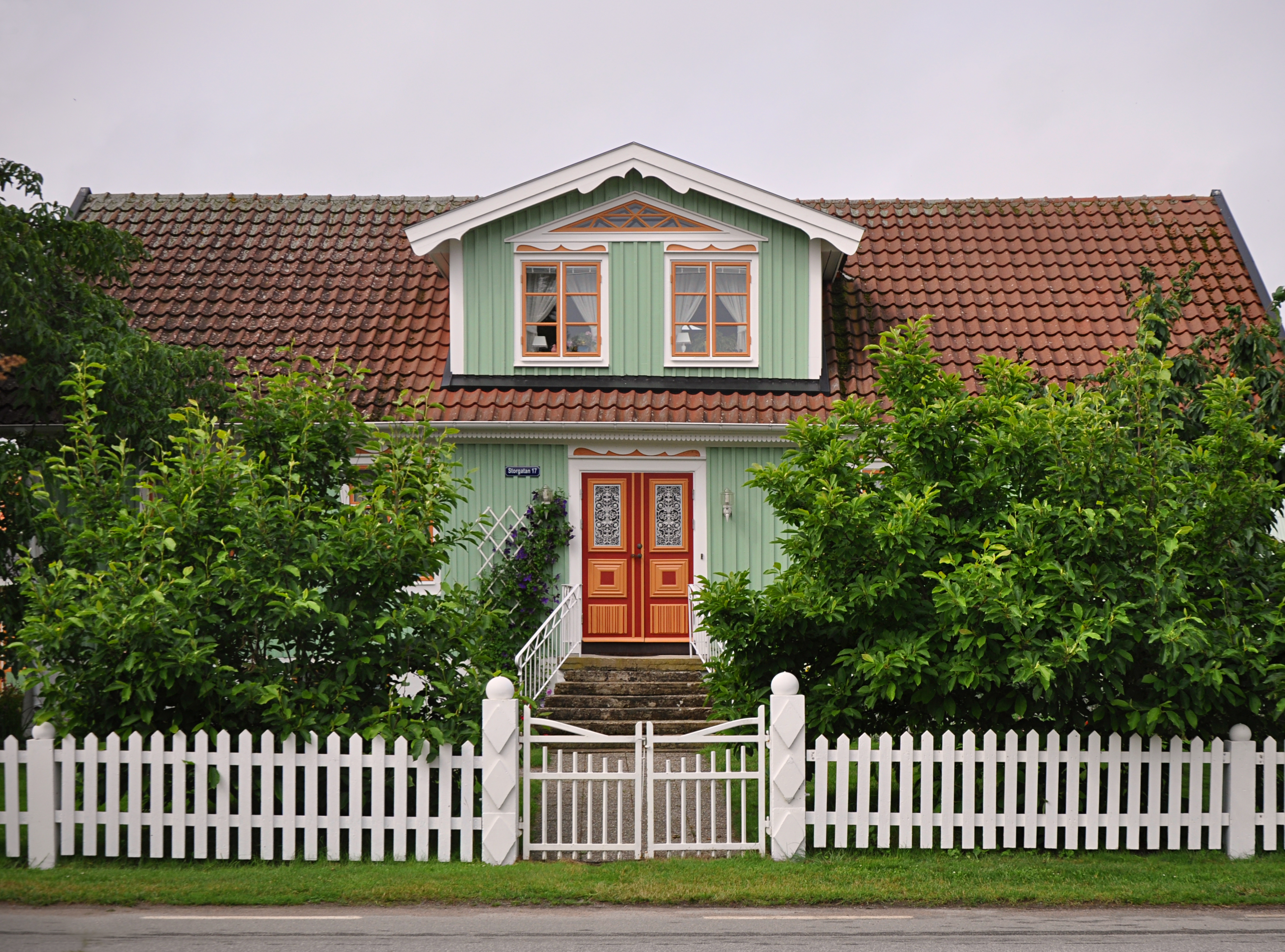

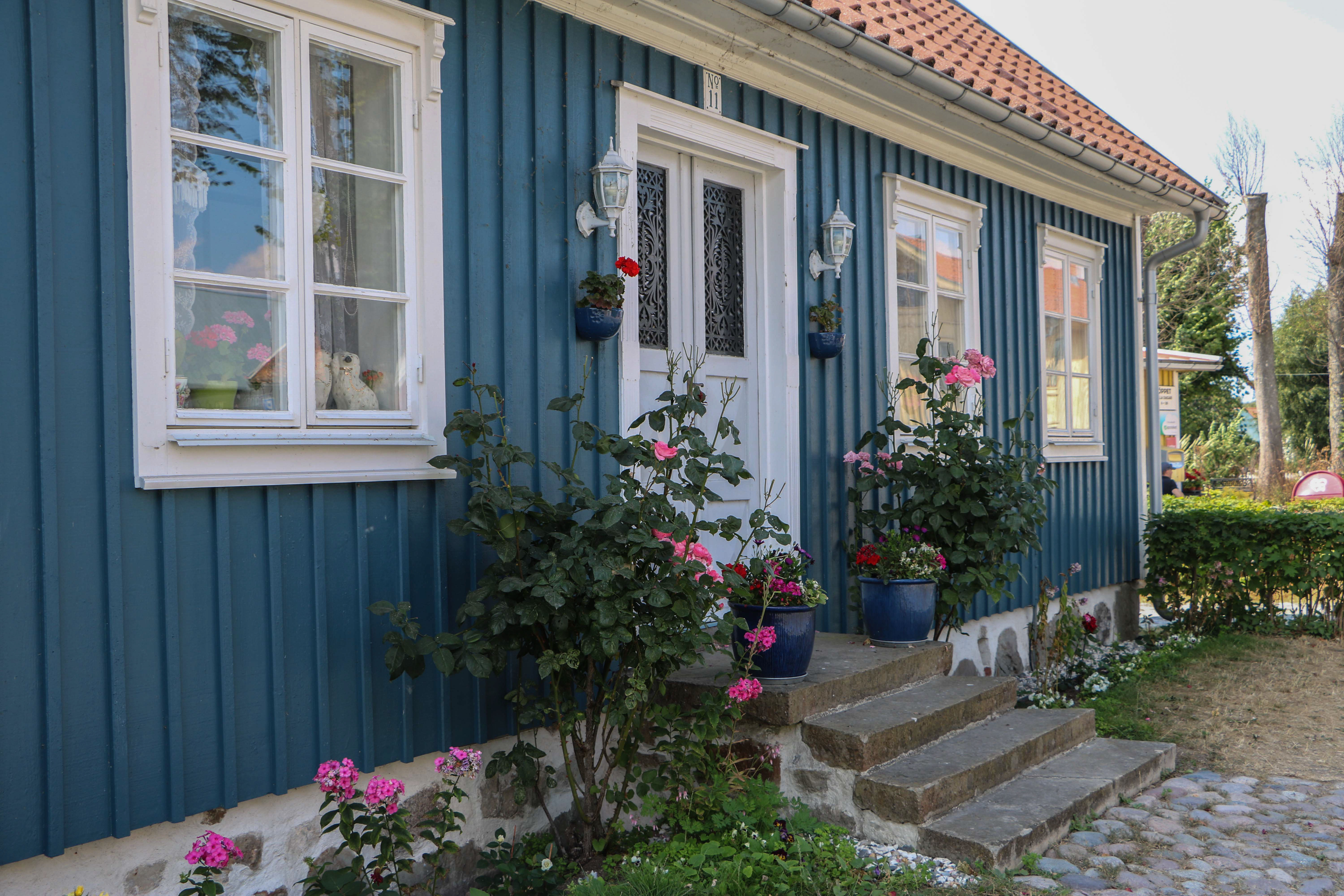

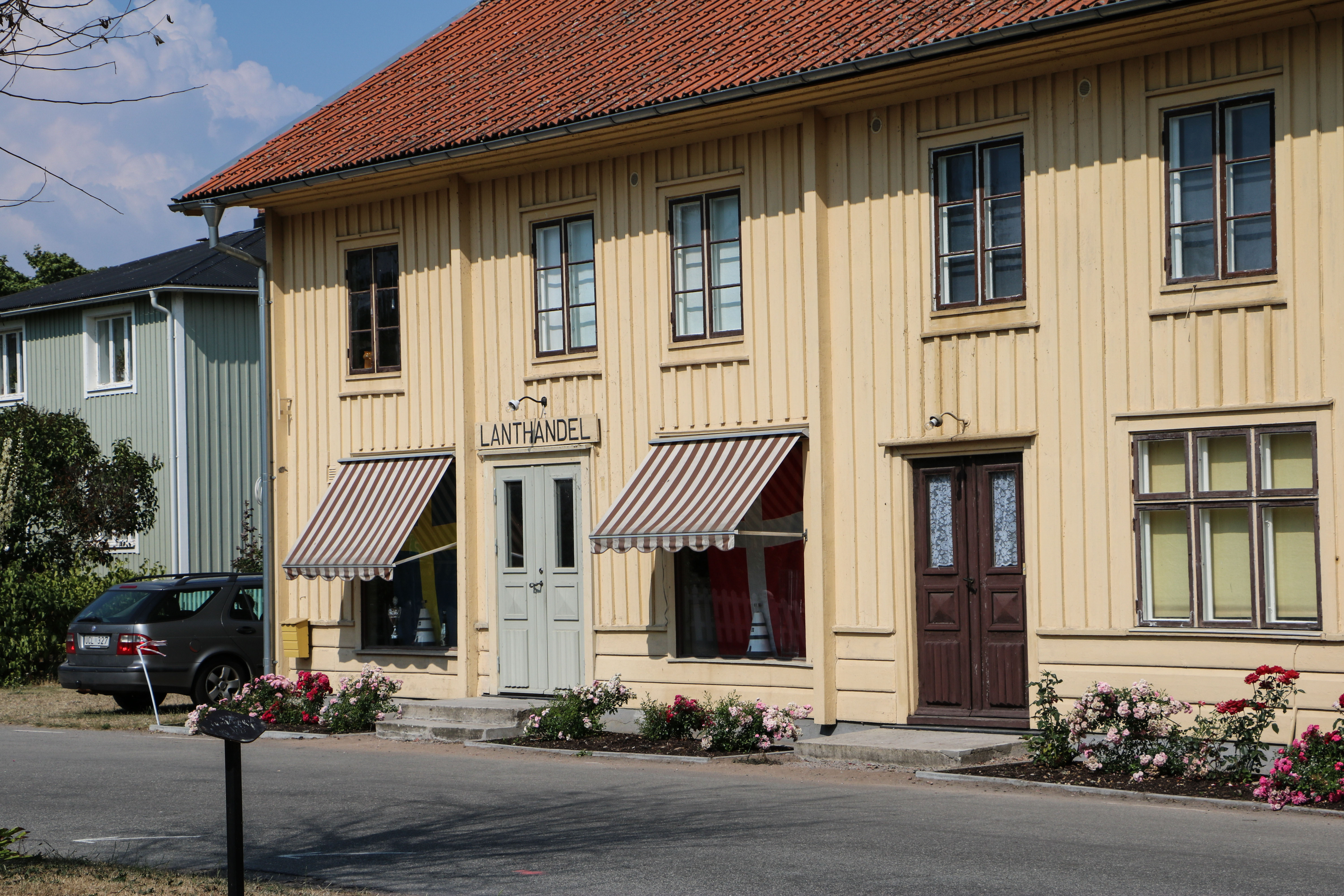

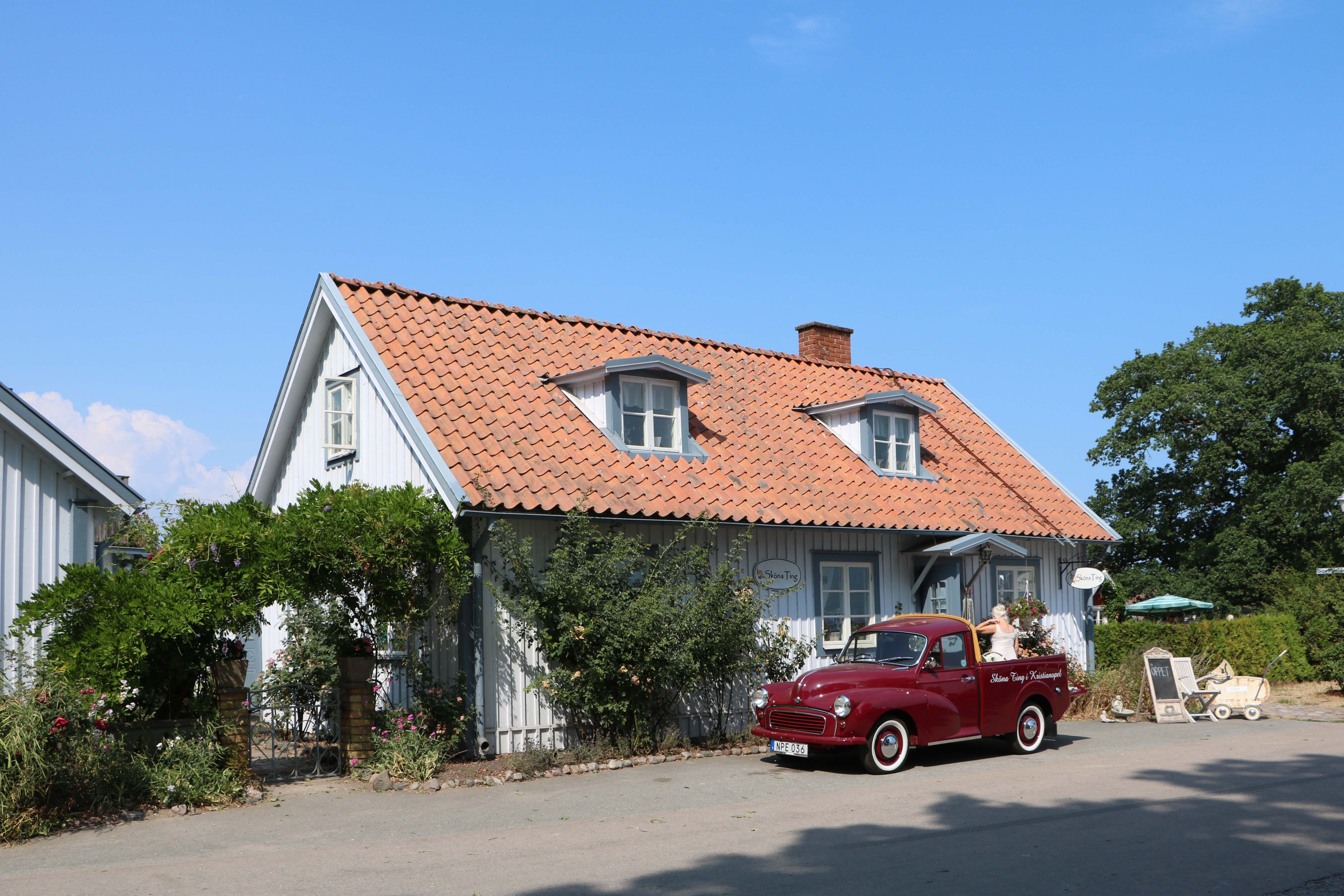
