= Värnanäs archipelago =

Nature reserve in Kalmar County, Sweden

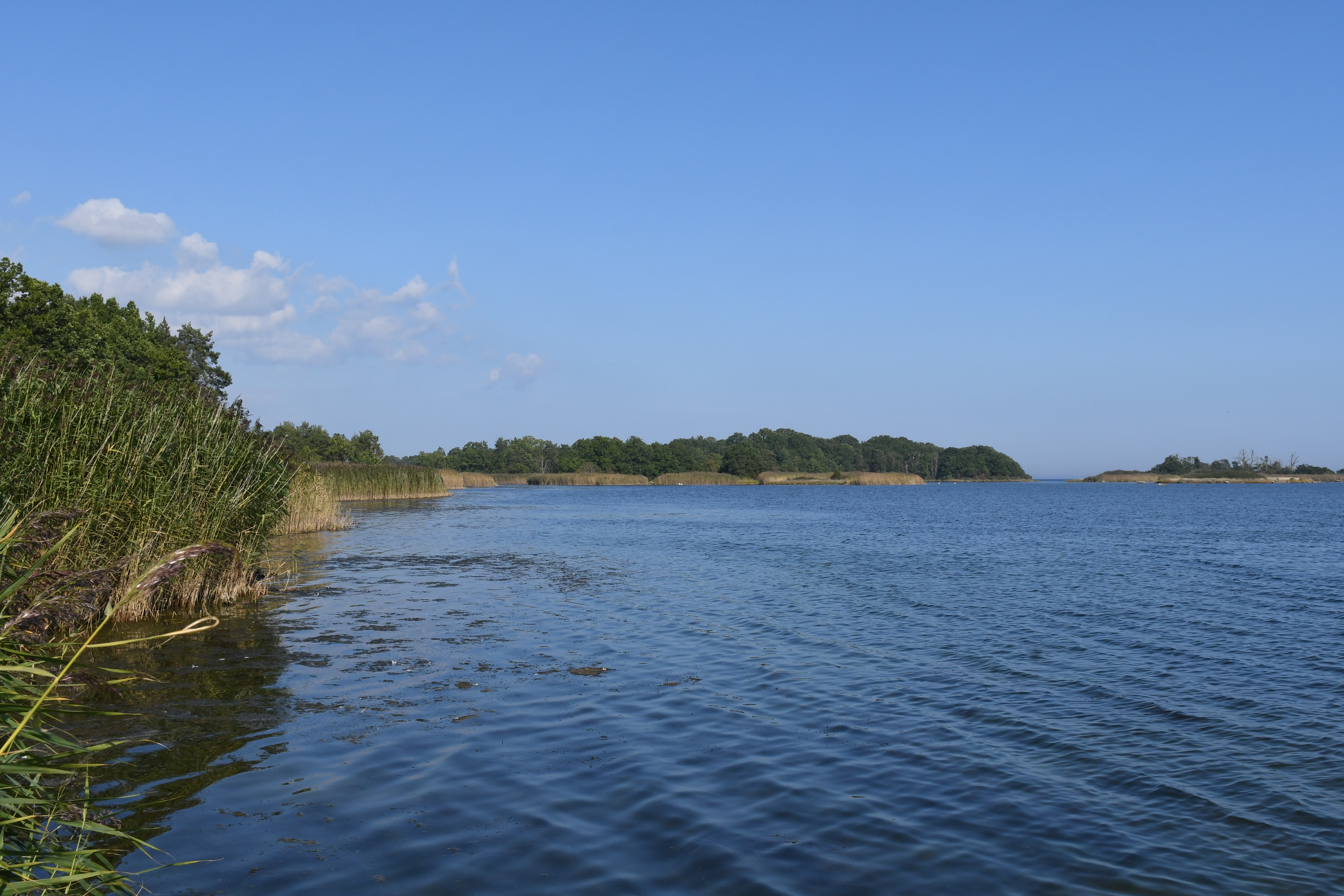

- Location within Sweden
- Location: Sweden
- Nearest city: Kalmar
- Coordinates: 56°27′56″N 16°08′18″E
- Area: 1,553 ha (3,840 acres)

Värnanäs archipelago (Swedish: Värnanäs skärgård) is a nature reserve and Natura 2000 designated area situated in south-eastern Sweden, in Kalmar County.

The nature reserve consists of an archipelago of small, flat islands and skerries in shallow water, with large reed beds in the transitory zone between islands and open water. Several of the larger islands are forested, dominated by oak, pine and birch, while the smaller islands have a more diverse flora including areas of open land.

The archipelago is considered to be one of the most important breeding areas for harbour seal in the Baltic Sea, where the species is under threat. At most, 150 seals have been recorded in the nature reserve, contributing about 50% of the total amount of reproduction of the species in the Kalmarsund area.

The nature reserve also displays a rich bird-life. Osprey, white-tailed eagle and western marsh harrier are birds of prey regularly seen in the archipelago. Other recurring birds include common shelduck, velvet scoter, tufted duck and red-backed shrike.

Large parts of the area are restricted access areas during most of the spring, summer and early autumn.
