= Allan Widman =

Swedish politician (born 1964)

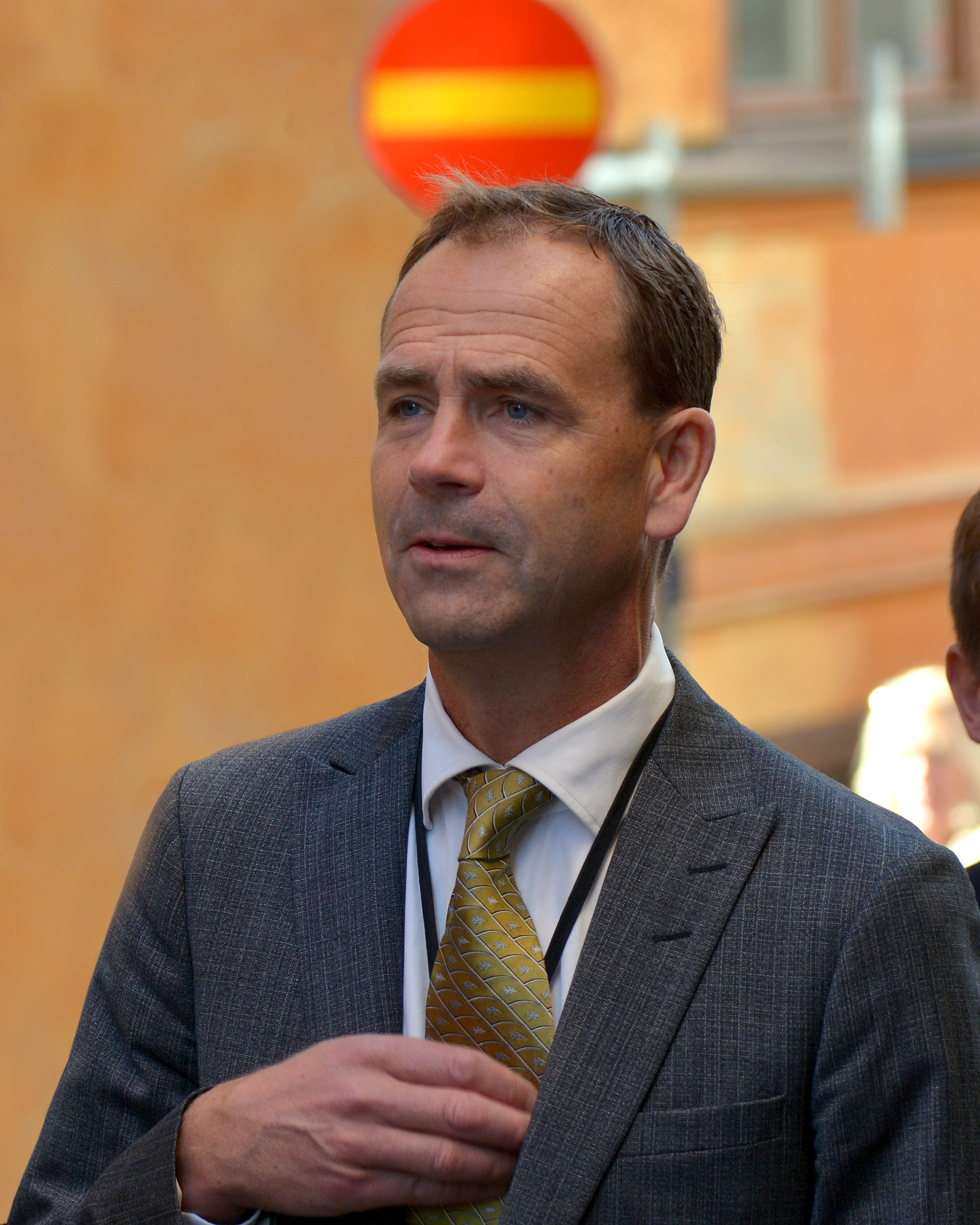

Governor of Kalmar County
- Incumbent
- Assumed office 1 May 2021
- Monarch: Carl XVI Gustaf
- Prime Minister: Ulf Kristersson
- Preceded by: Peter Sandwall

Member of Parliament
- In office 30 September 2002 – 26 September 2022
- Constituency: Malmö Municipality

Personal details
- Born: 20 March 1964 (age 62) Lyckeby, Blekinge County, Sweden
- Party: Liberals
- Education: Lund University (jur. kand)
- Occupation: Lawyer, politician

Karl Allan Fredrik Widman (born 20 March 1964) is a Swedish politician and civil servant who currently serves as Governor of Kalmar County since 1 May 2023.

A member of the Liberals, Widman was Member of Parliament (MP) from 2002 to 2022, representing Malmö Municipality. He was chairman of the parliamentary Committee on European Union Affairs from 2012 to 2014 and the Committee for Defence from 2014 to 2018.

Government offices
Preceded by Peter Sandwall	Governor of Kalmar County; 2023—	Succeeded by Incumbent
