= Johansfors Glasbruk =

Swedish glass maker

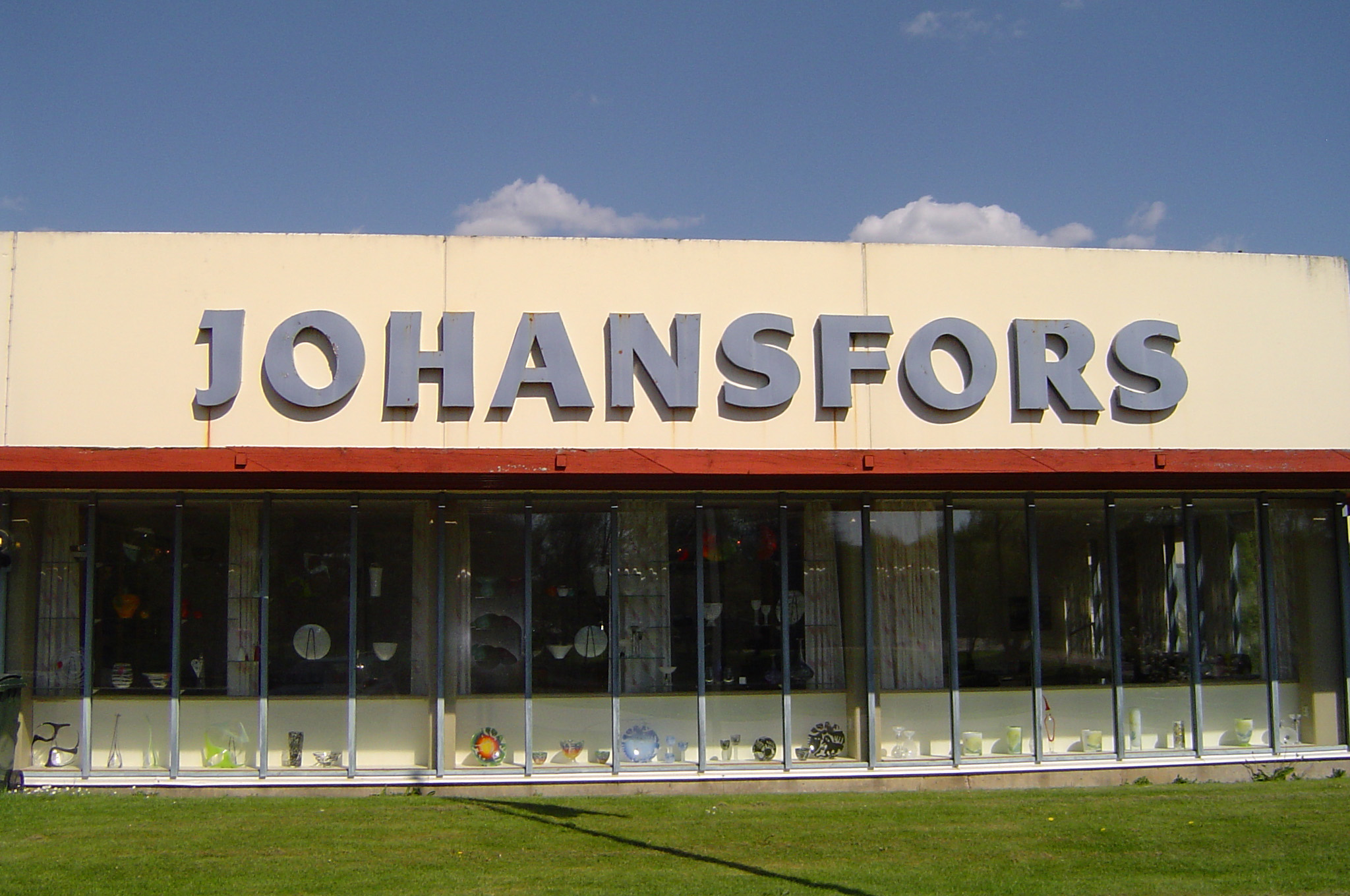
- Industry: Glass
- Founded: 1891
- Defunct: 2014
- Headquarters: 361 53 Broakulla, Johansfors, Småland, Sweden
- Area served: Sweden, Denmark, Netherlands, Europe
- Products: Glass

Johansfors Glasbruk was a Swedish glass maker founded in 1891. The current factory with glassblowing and glass furnaces was built in 1955 at the same place where it began in 1891. It was bought by Magnor Glassverk in 1997 after having had financial problems. The factory is now closed. Examples of the glass produced there can be seen at the nearby Johansfors Gallery (in Bruksgatan, Johansfors).
