= List of governors of Kalmar County =

Governor of Kalmar County
- Landshövding i Kalmar län
- Coat of arms of Kalmar County.
- Incumbent; Allan Widman since 1 May 2023
- Kalmar County Administrative Board
- Residence: The residence in Kalmar, Kalmar
- Appointer: Government of Sweden
- Term length: Six years (Note: The governor is often appointed for a six-year mandate. It can be extended if the person has not reached retirement age.)
- Formation: 1634
- First holder: Jesper Andersson Cruus
- Deputy: County Director (Länsrådet)
- Salary: SEK 97,800/month (2017)
- Website: Governor and County Director

This is a list of governors for Kalmar County of Sweden, from 1634 to present.

- Jesper Andersson Cruus (1634–1637)
- Conrad von Falkenberg (1637–1645)
- Gabriel Gyllenankar (1645–1655)
- Göran Eriksson Ulfsparre (1655–1656)
- Carl Filip von Sack (1656–1661)
- Claes Persson Banér (1661–1664)
- Gustaf Cruus (1664–1666)
- Peder Persson Hammarskiöld (1666–1671)
- Mauritz Posse (1671–1674)
- Conrad Gyllenstierna (1674–1677)
- Henrik von Vicken (1677–1679)
- Hans Georg Mörner (1679–1680)
- Hans Wachtmeister (1680–1683)
- Hans Clerck (1683–1694)
- Carl Gyllenpistol (1694–1695)
- Blechardt Wachtmeister (1695–1701)
- Reinhold Rehbinder (1701–1709)
- Adam Carl de la Gardie (1709–1711)
- Gabriel Gyllengrip (1711–1721)
- Georg Vilhelm Fleetwood (1721–1728)
- Gustaf von Psilander (1728–1734)
- Georg Bogislaus Stael von Holstein (1734–1754)
- Nils Djurklou (1755–1757)
- Carl Gustaf Roxendorff (1757–1774)
- Carl Rappe (1774–1781)
- Lars Fredrik Kaulbars (1781–1788)
- Fredrik von Köhler (1788–1790)
- Mikael Ankarsvärd (1790–1810)
- Johan Georg de la Grange (1810–1822)
- Gustaf Peter Nordenanckar (1822–1839)
- Jakob August von Hartmansdorff (1839–1840)
- Claes Ulrik Nerman (1840–1852)
- Knut Erik Sköldebrand (1852–1873)
- Gustav Jakob Edelstam (1873–1888)
- Viktor Lennart Groll (1888–1896)
- Karl Adolf Fagerlund (1896–1903)
- Conrad Cedercrantz (1903–1917)
- John Ludvik Falk (1917–1938)
- Arvid Lidén (1938–1947)
- Ruben Wagnsson (1947–1958)
- Ivar Persson (1959–1967)
- Erik Westerlind (1968–1981)
- Eric Krönmark (1981–1996)
- Anita Bråkenhielm (1996–2002)
- Sven Lindgren (2002–2011)
- Stefan Carlsson (2012–2016)
- Vacant (2016–2017)
- Thomas Carlzon (2017–2019)
- Cecilia Schelin Seidegård (2019–2020, acting)
- Peter Sandwall (2020–2022)
- Johan Blom (2022–2023, acting)
- Allan Widman (2023–)
