= Lyckeby =

- Village
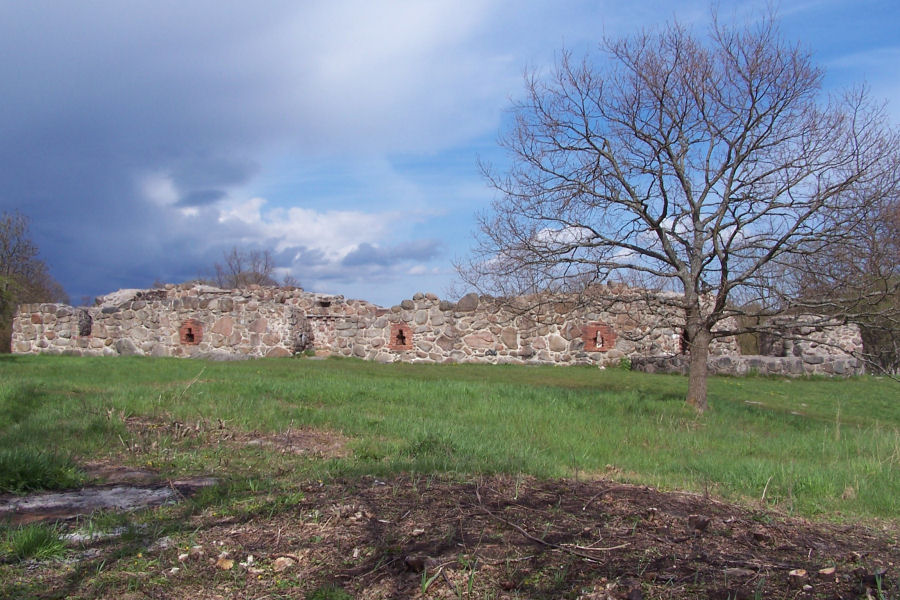
- Ruins of Lyckå Castle

- Location in Blekinge County
- Coordinates: 56°12′N 15°39′E
- Country: Sweden
- County: Blekinge County
- Municipality: Karlskrona Municipality
- Time zone: UTC+1 (CET)
  - Summer (DST): UTC+2 (CEST)

Lyckeby is a village in Karlskrona Municipality, Blekinge County, in southeastern Sweden, near the mouth of the Lyckeby River. The town was originally known as Lyckå.

== History ==
The first recorded mention of the town was in 1449, when Claus Nielsen Sparre purchased lands on the southern edge of town, where he built an estate with a small castle. At the time, Blekinge was part of the Kingdom of Denmark under Scanian Law, and Lyckeby became the seat of Lyckå Län.

Due to its location on the borderland between Denmark and Sweden, Lyckeby was often subject to raids and fighting between the two kingdoms. In 1507, Blekinge was raided by Sweden, and Lyckeby was plundered and set on fire. In 1545, under the orders of Danish King Christian II, the castle was rebuilt on its old foundations by privy council member Ebbe Knudsen Ulfelt. It was intended to be a permanent residence that could better withstand attacks under an uprising. The reinforced castle was completed in 1560. However, in 1564, during the Northern Seven Years' War, Lyckeby was once again burnt down.

In 1600, Lyckeby lost its town privileges, because Christian IV preferred to focus on developing the recently founded Christianople. In 1601, the king ordered the castle to be torn down so that its stone could be used to fortify Christianople.

After the Treaty of Roskilde in 1658, Lyckeby was ceded to Sweden. In 1690, the town had become so poor it couldn't afford a priest, and in 1736, the church collapsed.

Lyckeby later lent its name to Lyckeby Rural Municipality (Lyckeby landskommun), which was incorporated into Karlskrona Municipality (Karlskrona kommun) in 1967.

== Archaeology ==
In old Lyckeby, north of the castle, archaeological digs were undertaken in the early 1970s, and archaeologists found cobblestone roads and the remains of houses with field stone foundations.

== Attractions ==
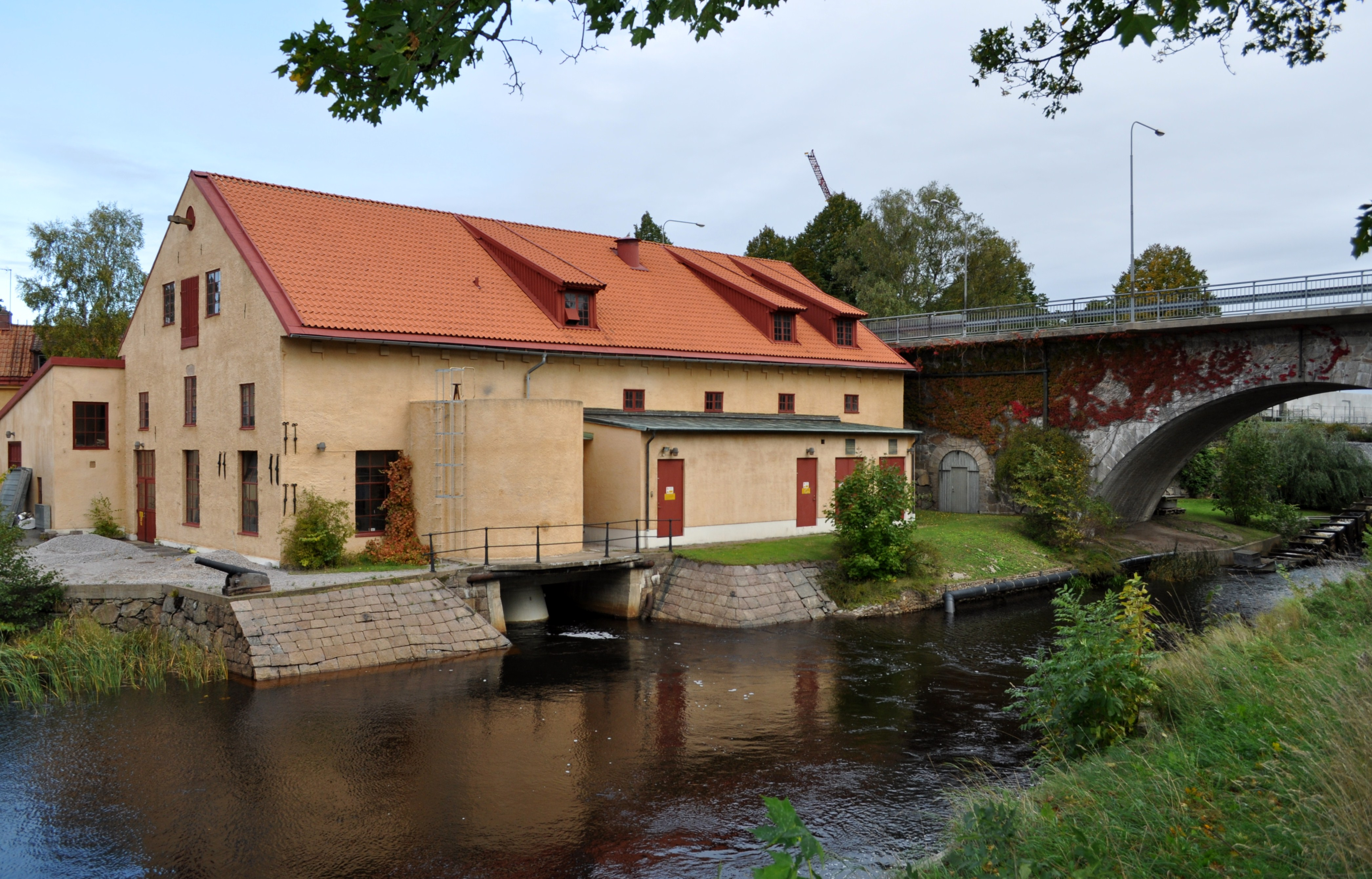
The old mill Kronokvarnen.

Attractions in Lyckeby include the town's cobblestone streets and the ruins of Lyckeby Castle (Lyckå slott). Lyckeby also features an old flour mill, Kronokvarnen, which was named a UNESCO World Heritage Site in 1998.
