= Kalmar County =

County (län) of Sweden

Kalmar County Kalmar län (Swedish)
- County of Sweden
- Flag Coat of arms

- Kalmar County in Sweden

- Location map of Kalmar County in Sweden
- Coordinates: 56°44′0″N 15°54′0″E
- Country: Sweden
- Founded: 1634
- Capital: Kalmar
- Municipalities: 12: Borgholm; Emmaboda; Högsby; Hultsfred; Kalmar; Mönsterås; Mörbylånga; Nybro; Oskarshamn; Torsås; Västervik; Vimmerby

Government
  - Governor: Allan Widman (Liberals)
  - Council: Region Kalmar County

Area
  - Total: 11,217.8 km^{2} (4,331.2 sq mi)

Population (31 December 2023)
  - Total: 246,667
  - Density: 21.9889/km^{2} (56.9510/sq mi)

GDP
  - Total: SEK 78 billion €8.377 billion (2015)
- Time zone: UTC+1 (CET)
  - Summer (DST): UTC+2 (CEST)
- ISO 3166 code: SE-H
- NUTS Region: SE213
- Website: h.lst.se

Kalmar County (Swedish: Kalmar län, pronounced [ˈkǎlmar lɛːn]) is a county or län in southern Sweden. It borders the counties of Kronoberg, Jönköping, Blekinge and Östergötland. To the east in the Baltic Sea is the island Gotland.

The counties are mainly administrative units. Geographically Kalmar County covers the eastern part in the Småland province, and the entire island of Öland.

== Culture ==
Much of Öland's present-day landscape known as the Stora Alvaret has been designated as a World Heritage Site by UNESCO. This southern part of Öland is known for a large number of rare species; early Paleolithic settlement at Alby; other prehistoric remains such as the Gettlinge Gravefield and Eketorp Fortress; and the Ottenby Nature Preserve.

== Administration ==
Kalmar County was integrated with Kronoberg County until 1672. Blekinge was a part of Kalmar County between 1680 and 1683, due to the foundation of the naval base at Karlskrona.

The seat of residence for the Governor or Landshövding is Kalmar. The Governor is the head of the County Administrative Board or Länsstyrelse. The County Administrative Board is a Government Agency headed by a Governor. See List of governors of Kalmar County.

Since 1997 the municipalities and the county council have cooperated through the indirectly politically controlled Regional Council of Kalmar County. The regional council represents the municipalities interests in regional growth issues, coordinates infrastructure planning, higher education and common cultural issues, and administers various governmental and EU grants.

== Riksdag elections ==
The table details all Riksdag election results of Kalmar County since the unicameral era began in 1970. The blocs denote which party would support the Prime Minister or the lead opposition party towards the end of the elected parliament.

Year	Turnout	Votes	V	S	MP	C	L	KD	M	SD	NyD	Left	Right
1970	88.6	153,510	3.5	45.0		25.4	9.6	2.7	13.4			48.6	48.4
1973	91.2	157,126	3.9	43.9		29.9	5.5	2.4	14.3			47.7	49.7
1976	92.3	164,975	3.2	43.3		29.6	6.7	3.2	15.1			46.6	51.4
1979	91.3	164,457	4.0	44.1		24.0	7.1	1.9	18.6			48.1	49.8
1982	91.7	165,881	3.8	46.1	1.3	21.7	3.9	2.3	20.8			49.9	46.4
1985	89.9	163,808	3.8	46.0	1.3	19.2	9.8		19.8			49.8	48.8
1988	86.6	156,667	4.5	45.4	4.3	18.1	8.1	3.5	15.9			54.2	42.1
1991	87.2	158,445	3.8	39.6	2.7	14.4	5.8	7.9	18.2		6.9	43.4	46.4
1994	87.2	158,424	5.6	47.6	4.3	13.0	4.4	4.3	19.0		1.3	57.5	40.6
1998	81.6	145,002	11.5	39.4	3.9	9.2	2.8	13.3	18.3			54.8	43.7
2002	80.7	144,228	7.3	43.7	3.6	10.6	8.9	11.3	12.7	0.8		54.6	43.5
2006	82.2	147,531	5.0	41.4	3.9	11.1	5.2	7.1	21.3	3.2		50.2	44.7
2010	85.0	154,736	5.1	35.9	5.6	8.9	5.1	6.0	26.9	5.8		46.2	46.9
2014	86.7	158,822	4.6	35.5	4.7	8.7	3.5	4.7	20.3	15.3		44.7	37.3
2018	88.1	160,864	6.1	31.2	2.9	9.8	3.8	7.2	17.2	20.6		50.0	48.8
2022	86.0	163,223	4.6	31.7	3.6	6.5	3.2	7.0	17.8	24.5		46.4	52.5

== Municipalities ==
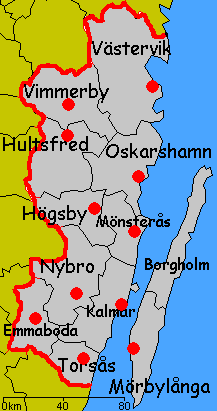
Map of municipalities

On the mainland:

- Emmaboda
- Hultsfred
- Högsby
- Kalmar
- Mönsterås
- Nybro
- Oskarshamn
- Torsås
- Vimmerby
- Västervik

On Öland:

- Borgholm
- Mörbylånga

== Localities in order of size ==
The five most populous localities of Kalmar County in 2020:

#	Locality	Population
1	Kalmar	41,852
2	Västervik	21,472
3	Oskarshamn	18,921
4	Nybro	13,599
5	Vimmerby	8,231

=== Foreign background ===
SCB have collected statistics on backgrounds of residents since 2002. These tables consist of all who have two foreign-born parents or are born abroad themselves. The chart lists election years and the last year on record alone.

Location	2002	2006	2010	2014	2018	2019
Borgholm	5.3	5.7	7.2	9.1	12.3	12.4
Emmaboda	10.2	11.9	13.6	15.8	22.3	23.4
Hultsfred	9.3	10.6	13.2	17.6	24.6	24.7
Högsby	10.3	11.4	14.8	19.2	28.7	28.5
Kalmar	8.9	10.3	12.1	13.9	17.1	17.9
Mönsterås	6.8	8.4	9.1	12.3	17.1	17.3
Mörbylånga	4.6	4.8	5.8	7.1	9.8	9.9
Nybro	9.7	10.6	12.5	15.9	21.8	22.1
Oskarshamn	8.8	10.2	11.9	14.1	17.9	18.3
Torsås	5.4	6.9	8.6	9.8	13.5	13.4
Vimmerby	5.8	7.2	8.8	10.5	15.3	15.5
Västervik	7.2	8.0	9.0	10.8	13.9	14.0
Total	8.0	9.1	10.7	13.0	17.2	17.5
Source: SCB

== Heraldry ==
The County of Kalmar was formally granted its arms in 1944. Before this the county carried the arms of Småland and Öland side by side. The current arms is a combination of the arms for Småland and Öland. Blazon: "Quartered, the arms of Småland and Öland"

== See also ==
- Linnaeus University
- Arvid Jonsson
- Värnanäs archipelago (Nature reserve)
