= Rådmansgatan =

Rådmansgatan may refer to:

- Rådmansgatan, Malmö – a street in Malmö, Sweden
- Rådmansgatan, Stockholm – a street in Stockholm, Sweden
- Rådmansgatan metro station – a metro station in Stockholm, Sweden
