= Culture in Stockholm =

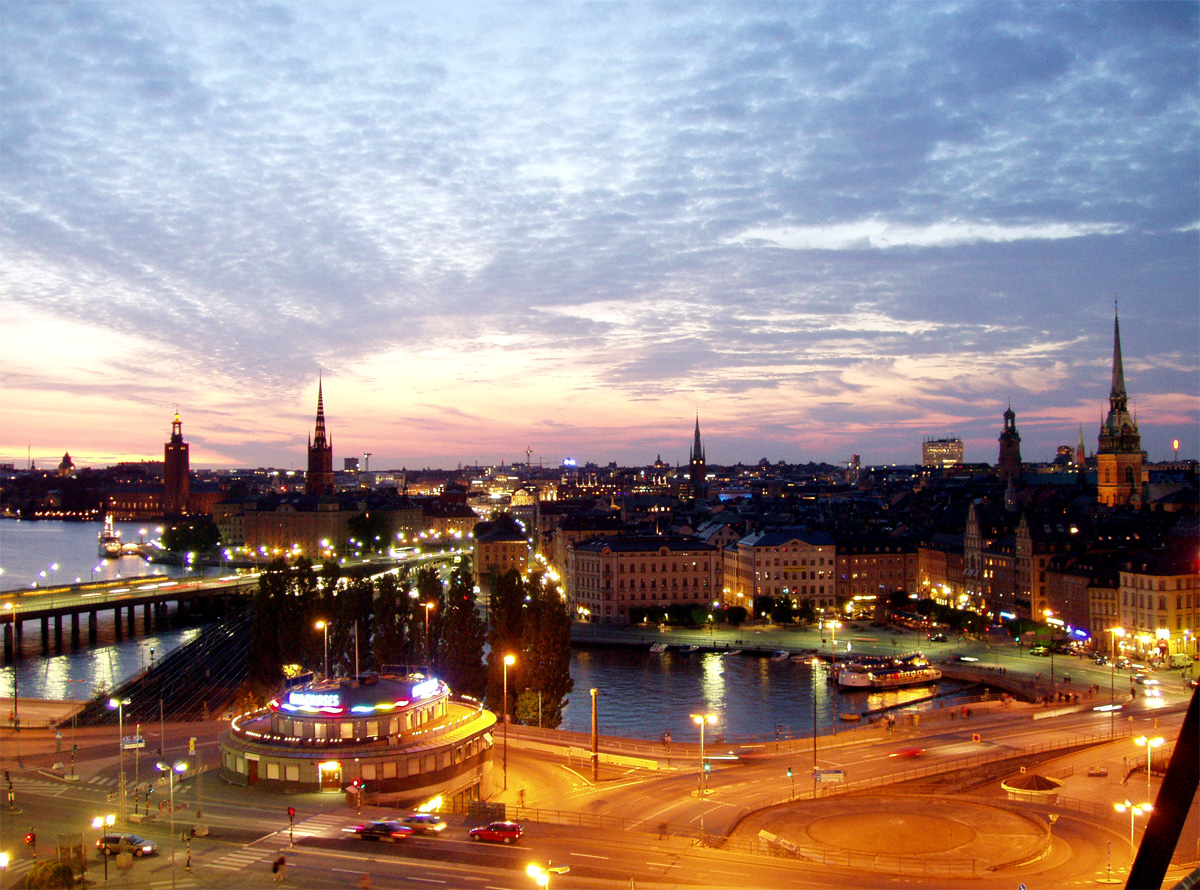
Stockholm Old Town

Apart from being a large city with an active cultural life, Stockholm, the capital of Sweden, houses many national cultural institutions. There are two UNESCO World Heritage Sites in the Stockholm County area: the Royal Palace Drottningholm (within Ekerö Municipality) and the Skogskyrkogården (The Woodland Cemetery).

Stockholm was the 1998 European City of Culture.

== Literature ==
Authors connected to Stockholm include the poet and songwriter Carl Michael Bellman (1740–1795), novelist and dramatist August Strindberg (1849–1912), and novelist Hjalmar Söderberg (1869–1941), all of whom made Stockholm part of their works. Other authors with notable heritage in Stockholm were the Nobel Prize laureate Eyvind Johnson (1900–1976) and the popular poet and composer Evert Taube (1890–1976). The novelist Per Anders Fogelström (1917–1998) wrote a popular series of historical novels depicting life in Stockholm from the 19th to the mid-20th century.

== Architecture ==
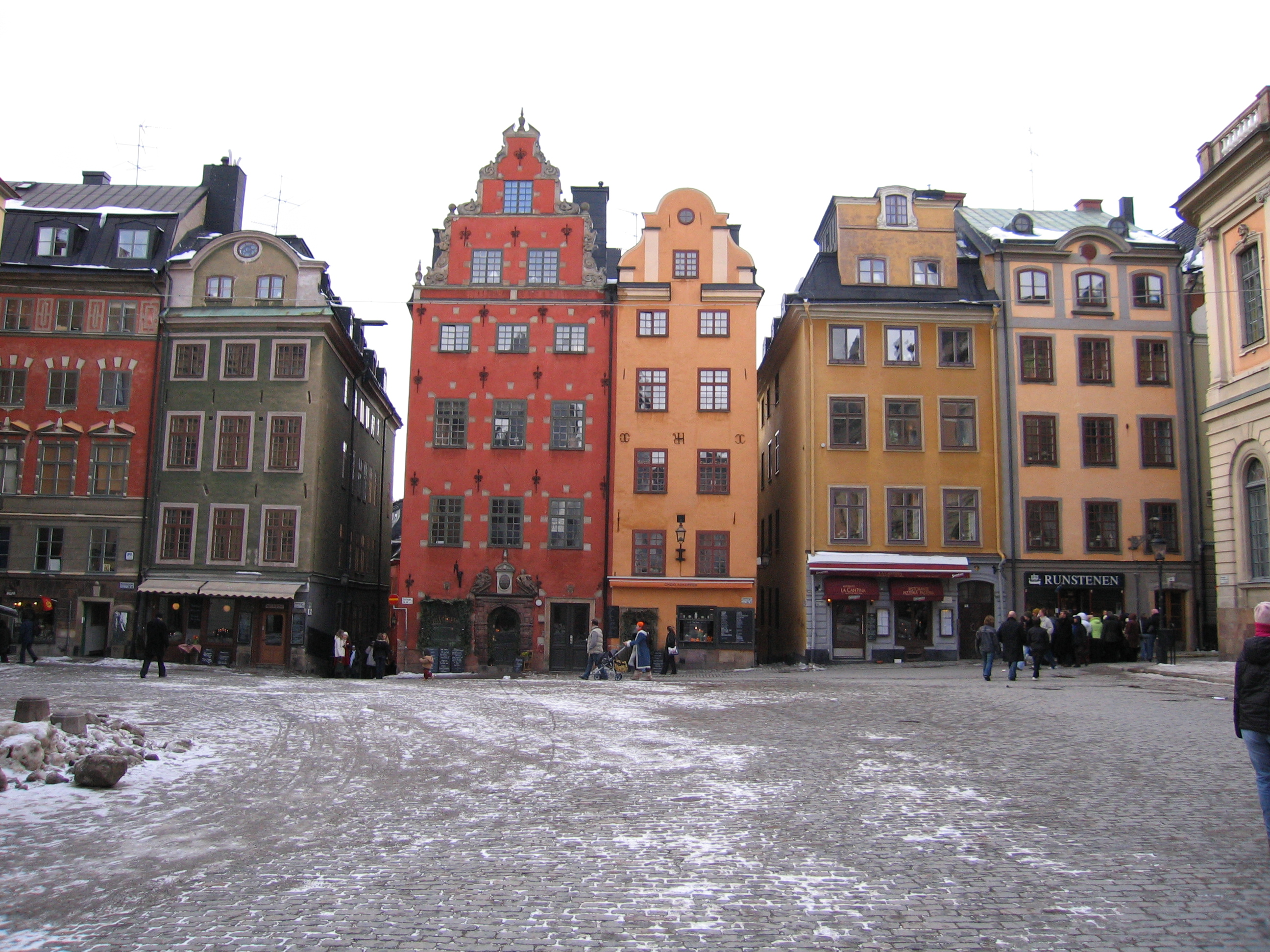
Historical buildings at Stortorget in Gamla Stan.

The city's oldest section is Gamla stan (Old Town), located on the original small islands of the city's earliest settlements and still featuring the medieval street layout. Some notable buildings of Gamla Stan are the large German Church (Tyska kyrkan) and several mansions and palaces: the Riddarhuset (the House of Nobles), the Bonde Palace, the Tessin Palace and the Oxenstierna Palace. The oldest building in Stockholm is the Riddarholmskyrkan from the late 13th century. After a fire in 1697 when the original medieval castle was destroyed, Stockholm Palace was erected in a baroque style. Storkyrkan Cathedral, the episcopal seat of the Bishop of Stockholm, stands next to the castle. It was founded in the 13th century but is clad in a baroque exterior dating to the 18th century.

As early as the 15th century, the city had expanded outside of its original borders. Some pre-industrial, small-scale buildings from this era can still be found in Södermalm. During the 19th century and the age of industrialization Stockholm grew rapidly, with plans and architecture inspired by the large cities of the continent such as Berlin and Vienna. Notable works of this time period include public buildings such as the Royal Swedish Opera and private developments such as the luxury housing developments on Strandvägen.

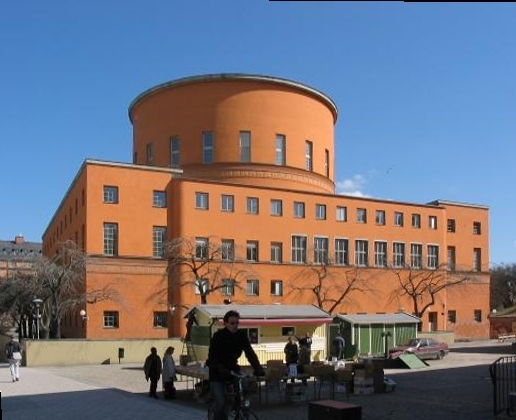
Stockholm Public Library, built 1928. Architect Gunnar Asplund.

In the 20th century, a nationalistic push spurred a new architectural style inspired by medieval and renaissance ancestry as well as influences of the Jugend / Art Nouveau style. A key landmark of Stockholm, the Stockholm City Hall, was erected 1911–1923 by architect Ragnar Östberg. Other notable works of these times are the Stockholm Public Library and the Forest Cemetery, Skogskyrkogården

Modernism characterized the style of the Stockholm International Exhibition (1930) and the development of the city as it grew in that decade. New residential areas sprang up such as the development on Gärdet while industrial development added to the growth, such as the KF manufacturing industries on Kvarnholmen located in the Nacka Municipality. In the 1950s, suburban development entered a new phase with the introduction of the Stockholm Metro. The modernist developments of Vällingby and Farsta where internationally praised. In the 1960s this suburban development continued but with the aesthetic of the times, the industrialised and mass-produced blocks of flats received a large amount of criticism.

At the same time that this suburban development was happening the most central areas of the inner city were being redesigned. Sergels Torg, with its five high-rise office towers was created in the 1960s, followed by the total clearance of large areas to make room for new development projects. The most notable buildings from this period is the ensemble of the House of Culture, City Theatre and National Bank building, designed by architect Peter Celsing.

=== Notable buildings ===
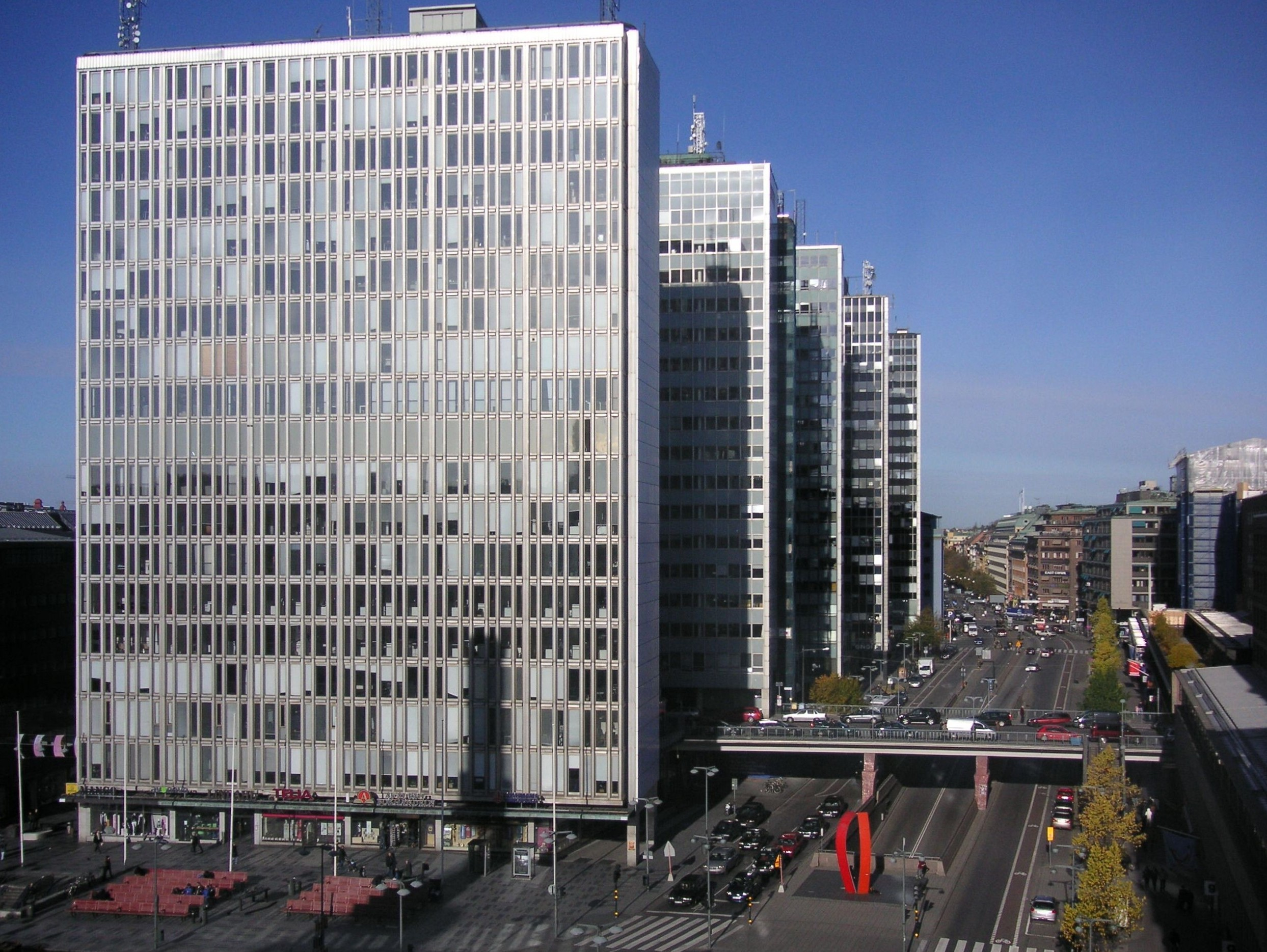
The Hötorget buildings in 2007

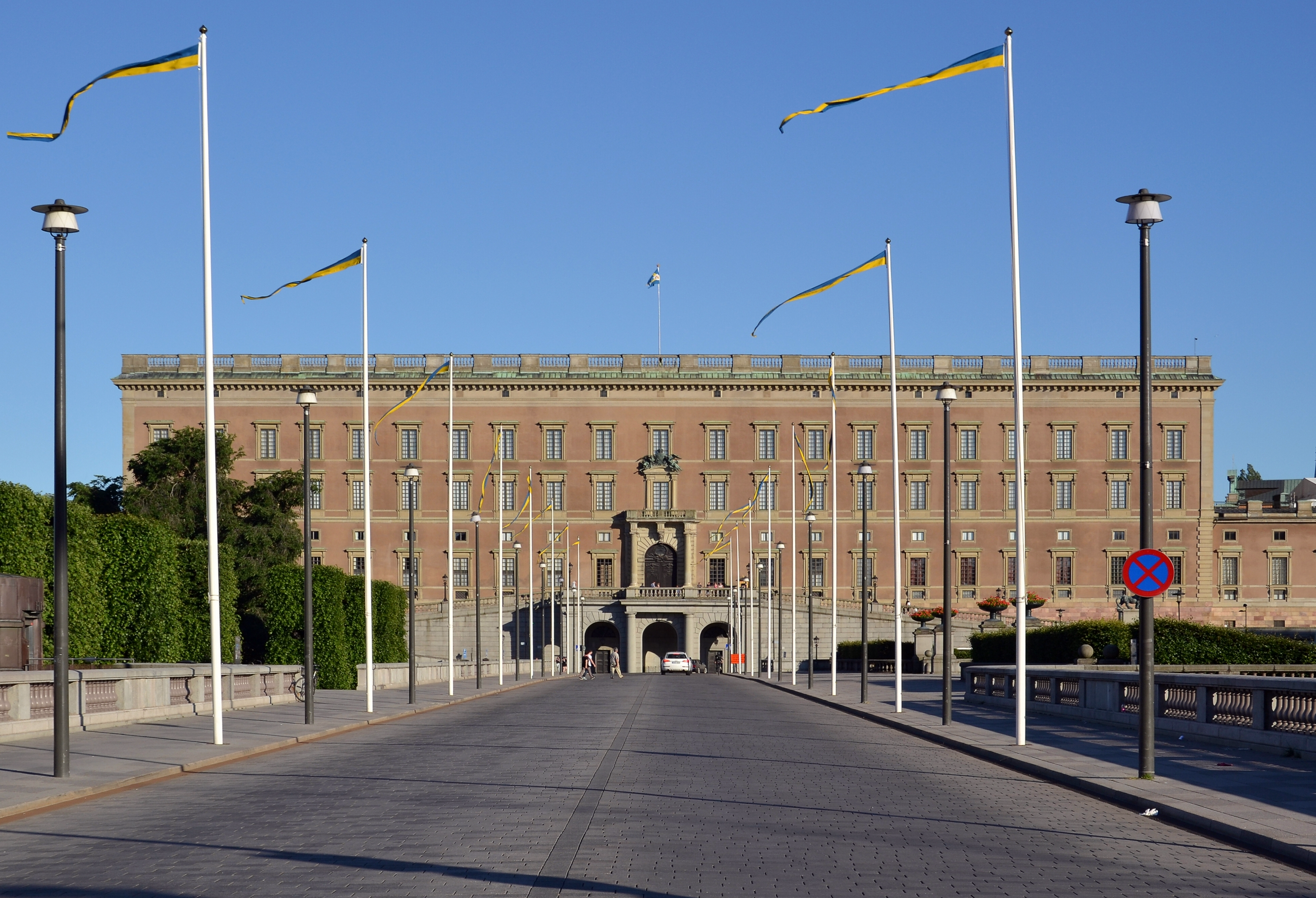
Stockholm Palace, the northern facade

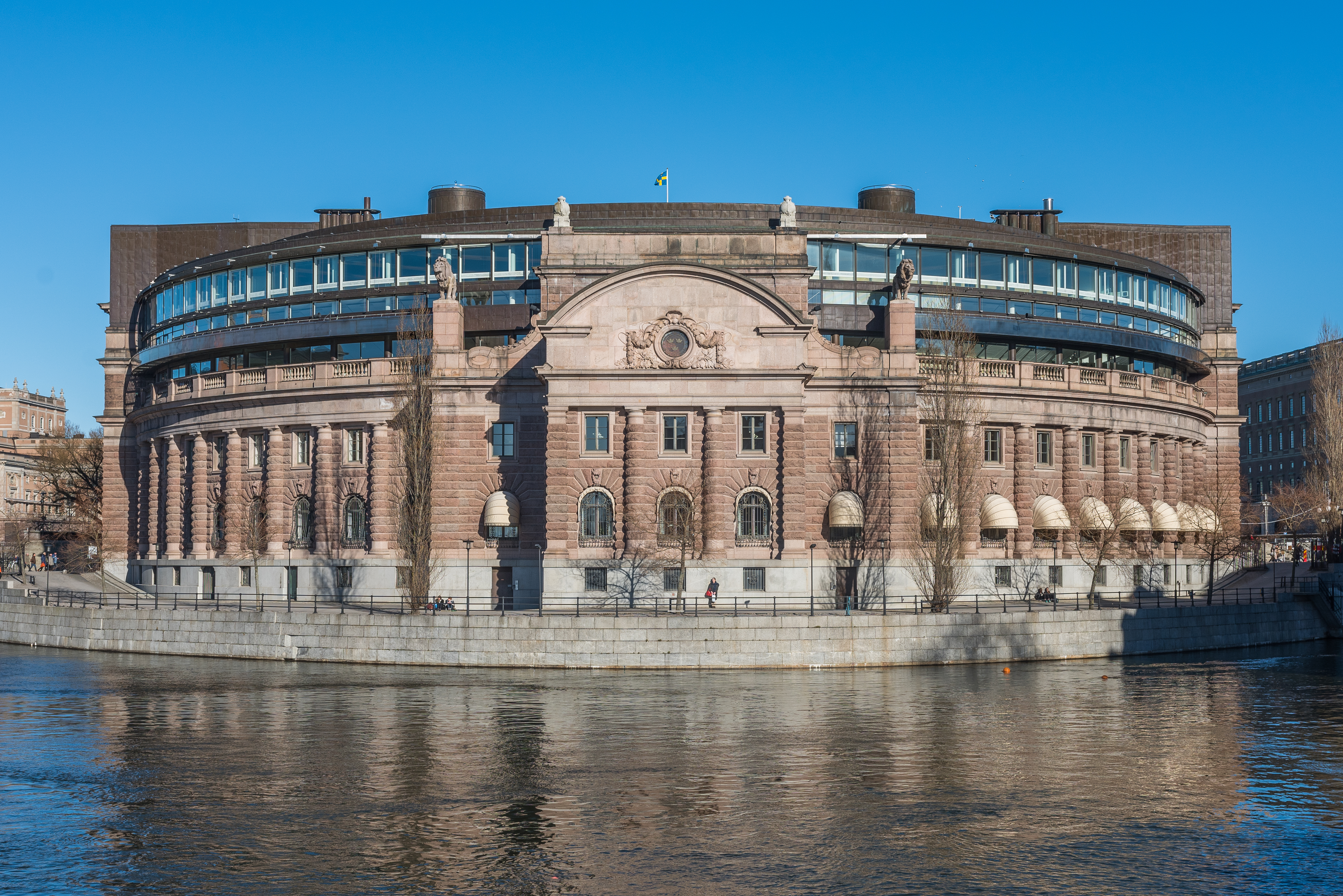
The Parliament House

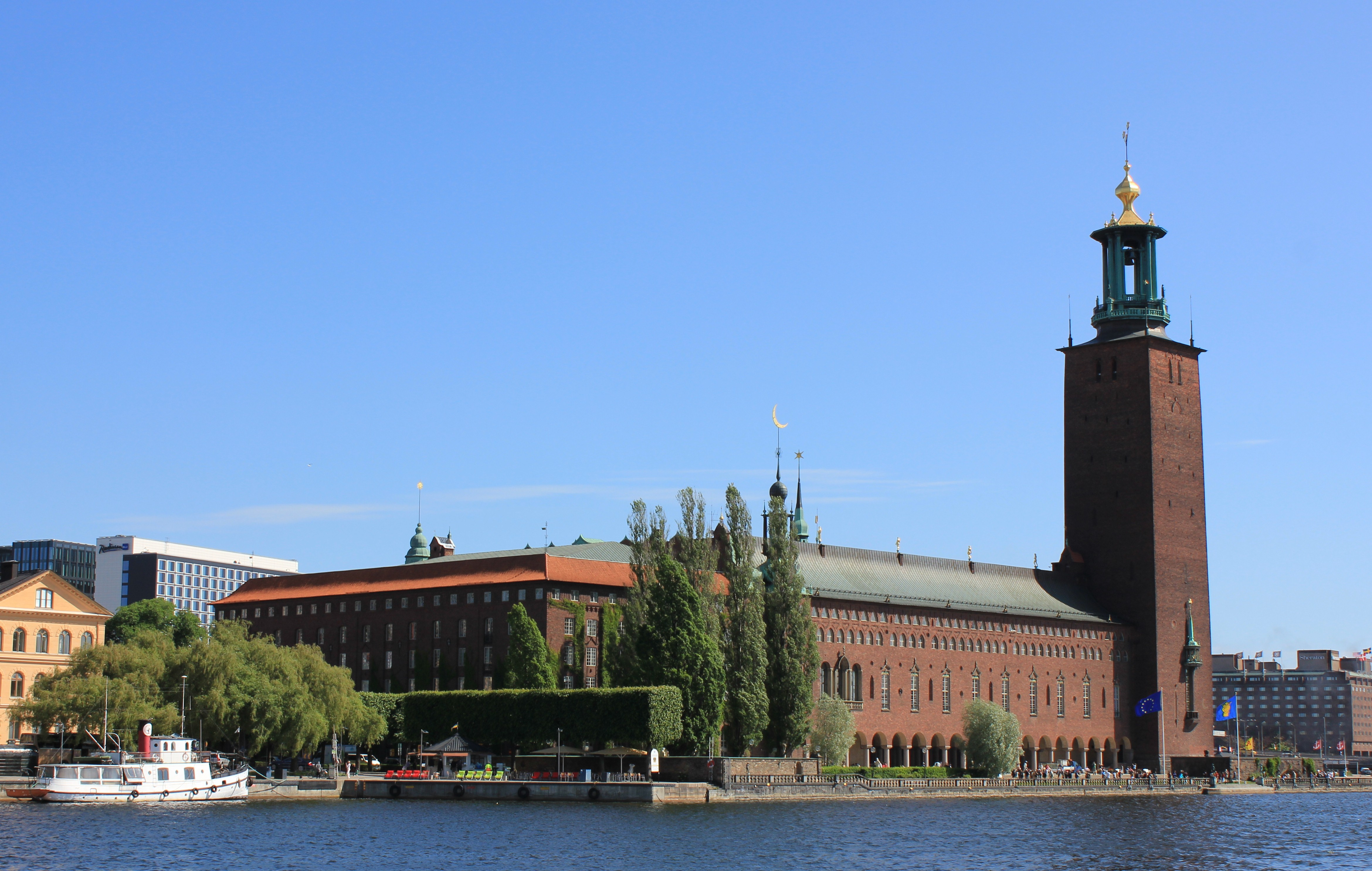
The Stockholm City Hall

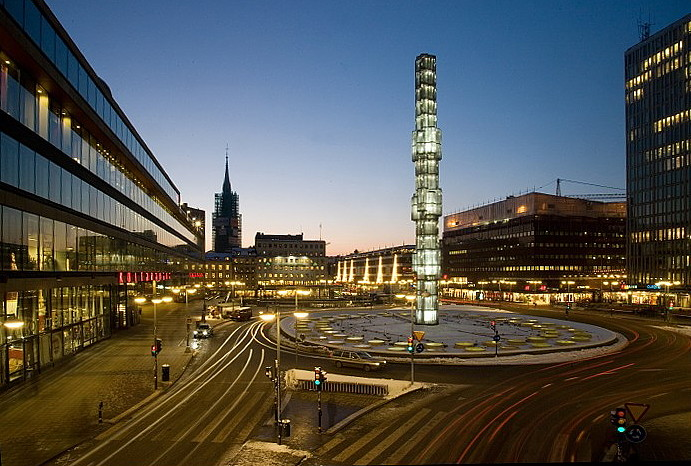
Modern construction at Sergels Torg

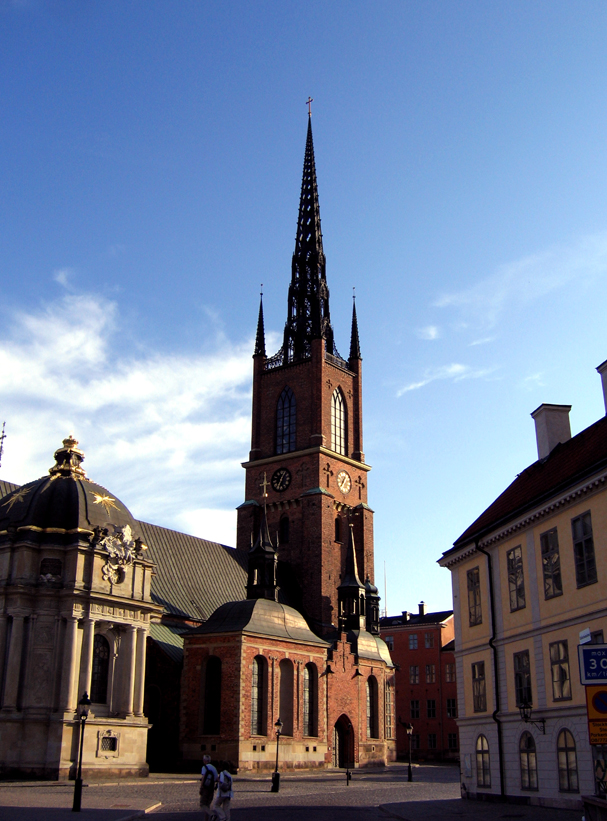
One of the oldest buildings in Stockholm, Riddarholmskyrkan

== Museums ==
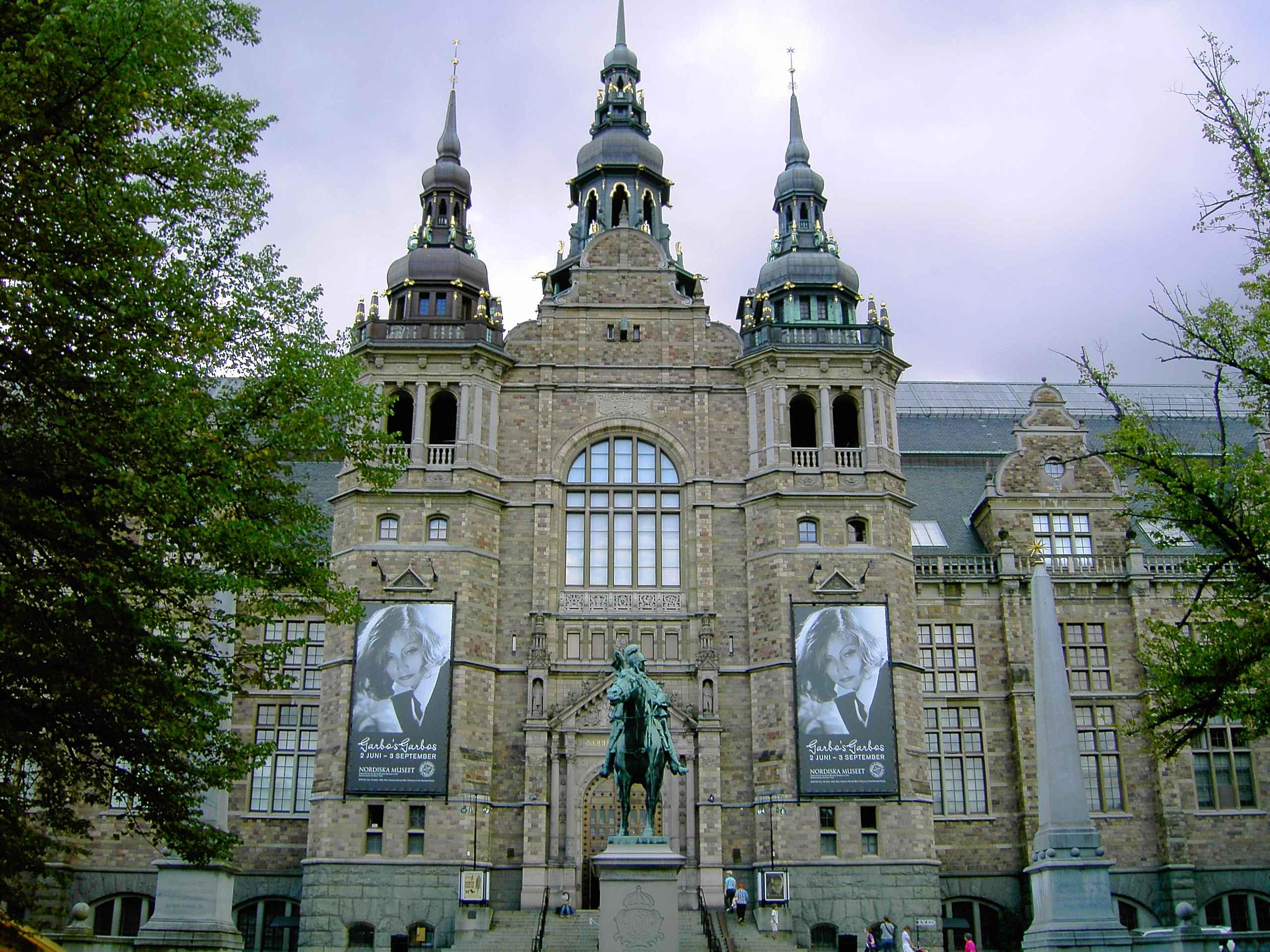
The Nordic Museum at Djurgården, Neo-renaissance style, built 1907. Architect Isak Gustaf Clason.

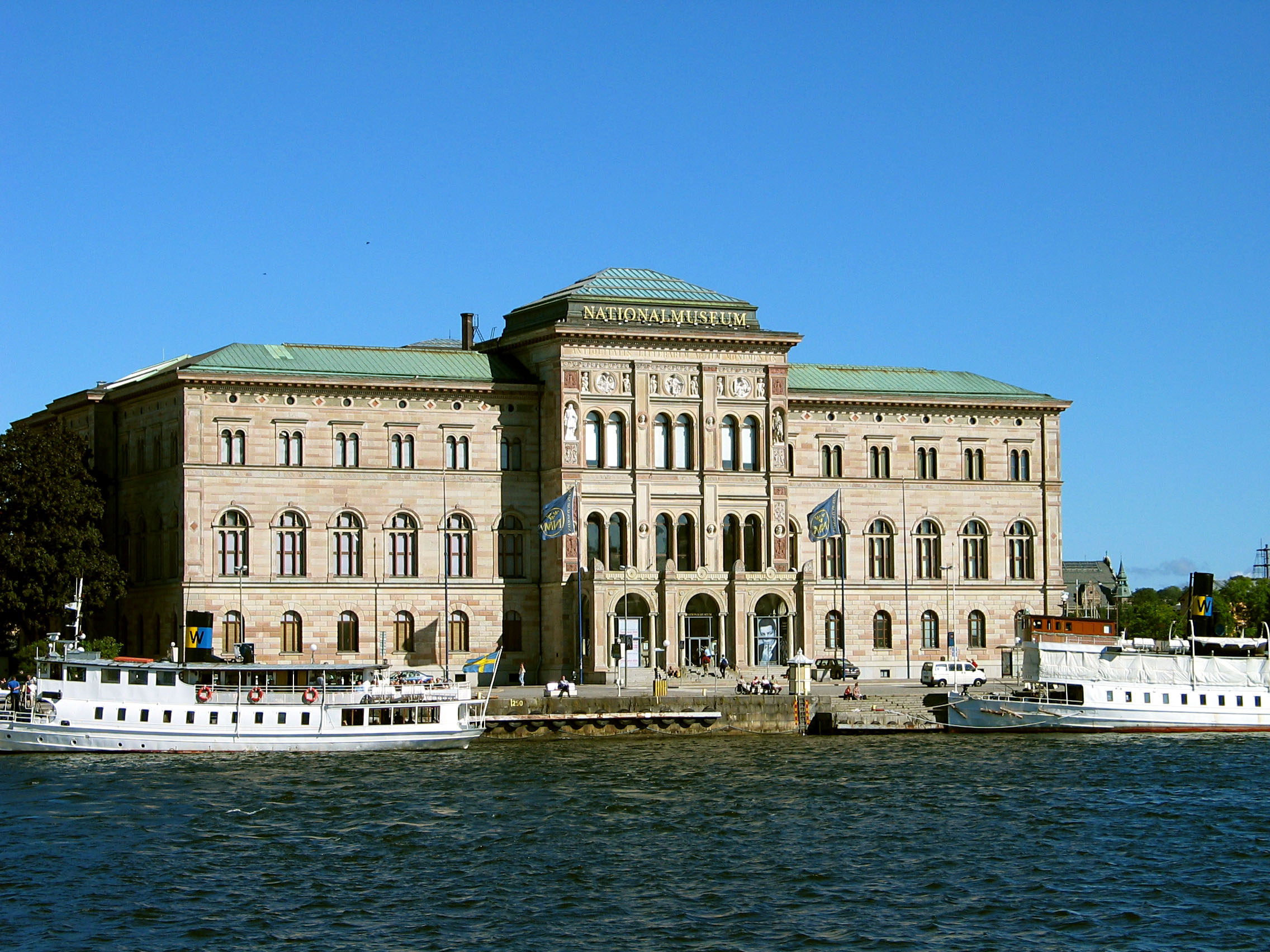
The National Museum.

Stockholm boasts some 70 museums, making the city host one of the largest numbers of museums in the world. Collectively, these museums are visited by over 9 million people per year.

One of the most renowned museums is the Nationalmuseum, with the largest national collection of art: 16,000 paintings and 30,000 objects of art handicraft. The collection dates back to the days of Gustav Vasa in the 16th century, and has since been expanded with works by artists such as Rembrandt, and Antoine Watteau, as well as constituting a main part of Sweden's art heritage, manifested in the works of Alexander Roslin, Anders Zorn, Johan Tobias Sergel, Carl Larsson, Carl Fredrik Hill and Ernst Josephson.

The Museum of Modern Art, or Moderna Museet, is Sweden's national museum of modern art. It has works by famous modern artists such as Picasso and Salvador Dalí.

Other notable museums in Stockholm include:

- Fotografiska Stockholm
- Nationalmuseum
- Skansen - An open air heritage museum and zoo
- Vasa Museum, dedicated to the restored Vasa, a ship that sank in 1628
- The Nordic Museum with art and design from the Nordic countries
- The Stockholm City Museum
- The Museum of Medieval Stockholm
- The National Museum of Science and Technology
- The National Maritime Museum
- The Swedish Museum of Natural History
- The Biological museum, Swedish flora and fauna.
- The Museum of Spirits
- Millesgården - The home of sculptor Carl Milles.

== Theatres ==
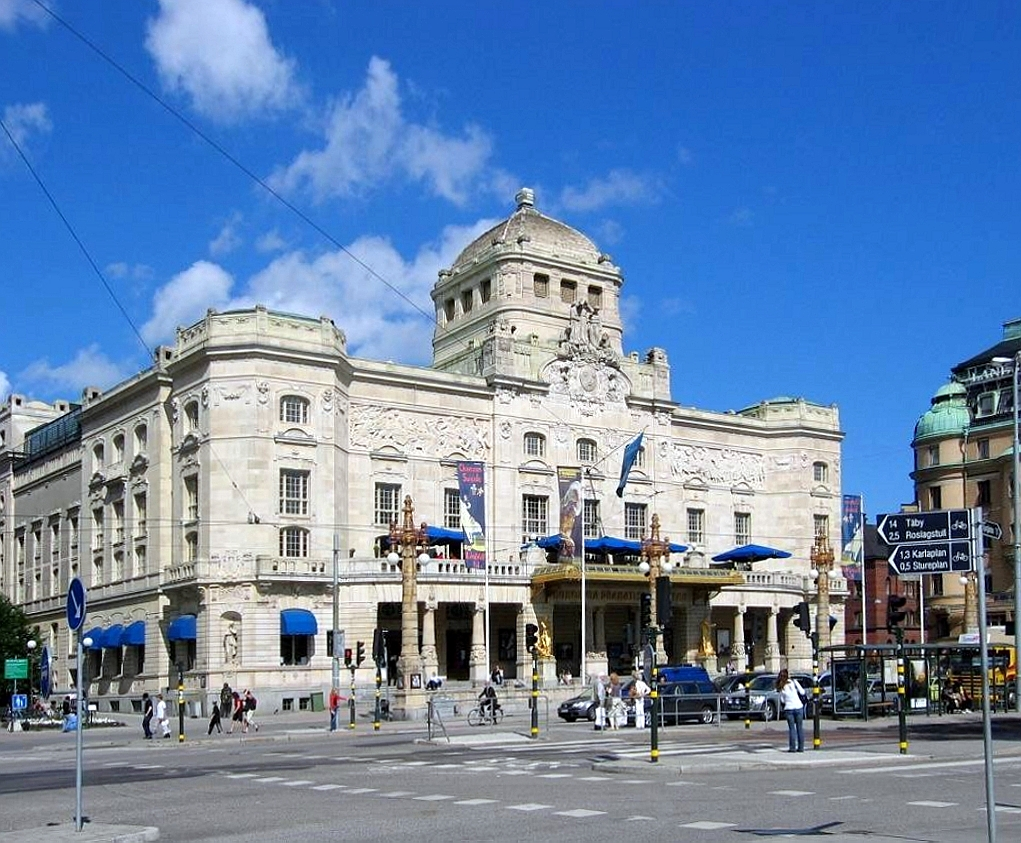
Dramaten, One of Stockholm's many theatres.

Distinguished among Stockholm's many theatres are the Royal Dramatic Theatre (Dramaten), one of Europe's most renowned theatres, and the Royal Swedish Opera, inaugurated in 1773.

Other notable theatres are the Stockholm City Theatre, the Peoples Opera (Folkoperan), the Modern Theatre of Dance (Moderna dansteatern), the China Theatre, the Göta Lejon Theatre, the Mosebacke Theatre, and the Oscar Theatre.

The stages of Stockholm number in their fifties at the least, and a wide variety of plays are constantly on, from classical to newly written.

== Media ==
Stockholm is basically the media center of Sweden. It has four nationwide daily newspapers, is also the central location of the publicly funded radio (SR) and television (SVT); in addition, all other major television channels have their base in Stockholm (TV4 TV3, TV6 and Kanal 5). All major magazines are also located to Stockholm, as are the largest literature publisher, the Bonnier group.

== Sports ==
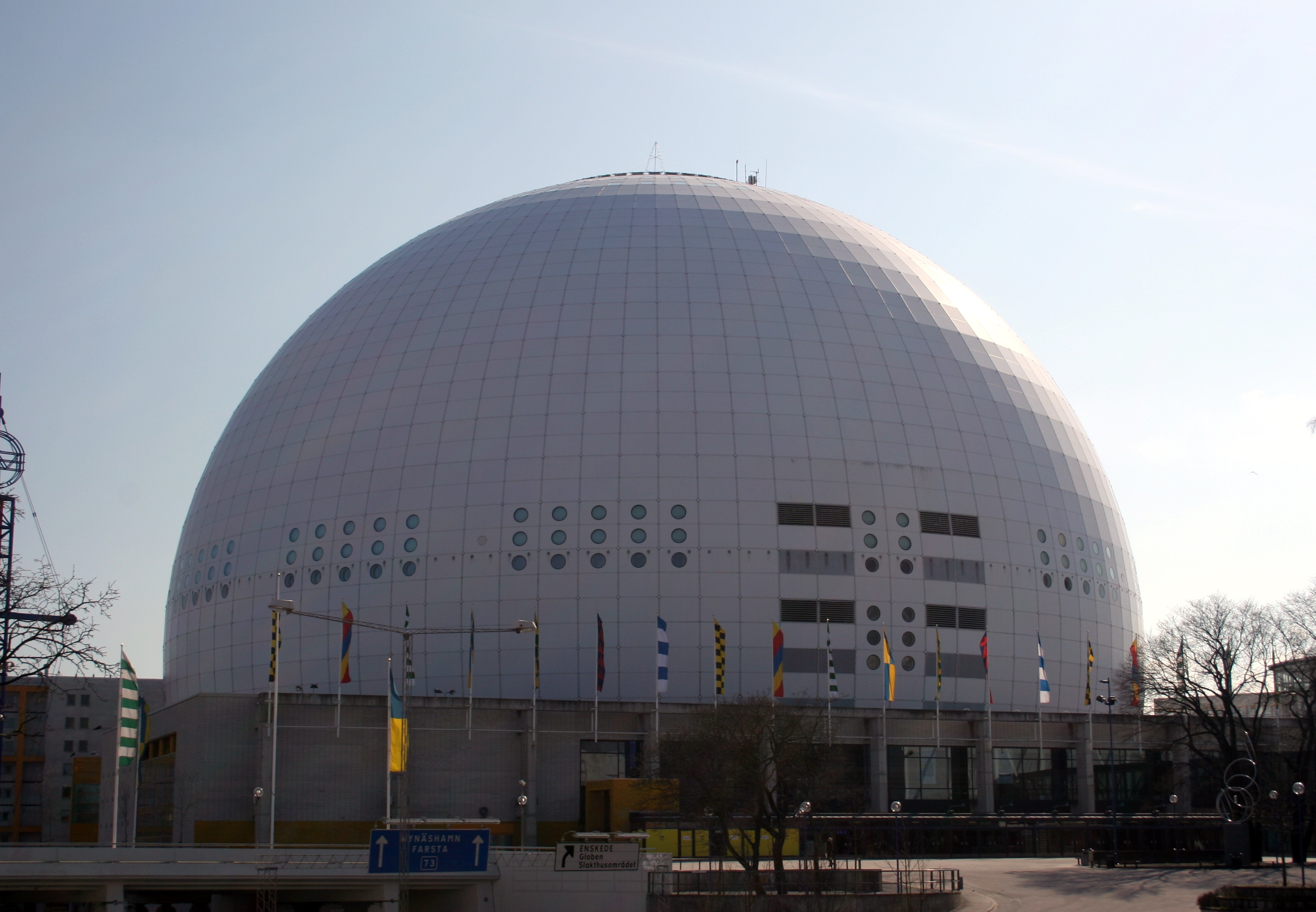
Avicii Arena, built 1989.

The most popular spectator sports are football and ice hockey. The three most popular football teams are AIK, Hammarby IF and Djurgårdens IF.

Historically, the city was the host of the 1912 Summer Olympics. From those days stem the Stockholms Olympiastadion which has since hosted numerous sports events, notably football and athletics. Stadion is known as the home arena of Djurgårdens IF. For Sweden men's national ice hockey team, the home arena is Avicii Arena, one of the largest spherical building in the world, but it is also hosting concerts and other events.

Stockholm also hosted all but one of the Nordic Games, a winter multi-sport event that predated the Winter Olympics.

== Annual events ==
- Stockholm Jazz Festival is one of Sweden's oldest festivals, the festival takes place at Skeppsholmen in July.
- Stockholm Pride is the largest Pride event in the Nordic countries and takes place in the last week of July every year. The Stockholm Pride always ends with a parade and in 2007, 50 000 people marched with the parade and about 500 000 watched it.
- The Stockholm Marathon takes place on a Saturday in early June each year
- The Nobel Banquet takes place at Stockholm City Hall every year on December 10

== See also ==
- Culture of Sweden
- History of Stockholm
