= Hötorget metro station =

Stockholm Metro station

Hötorget
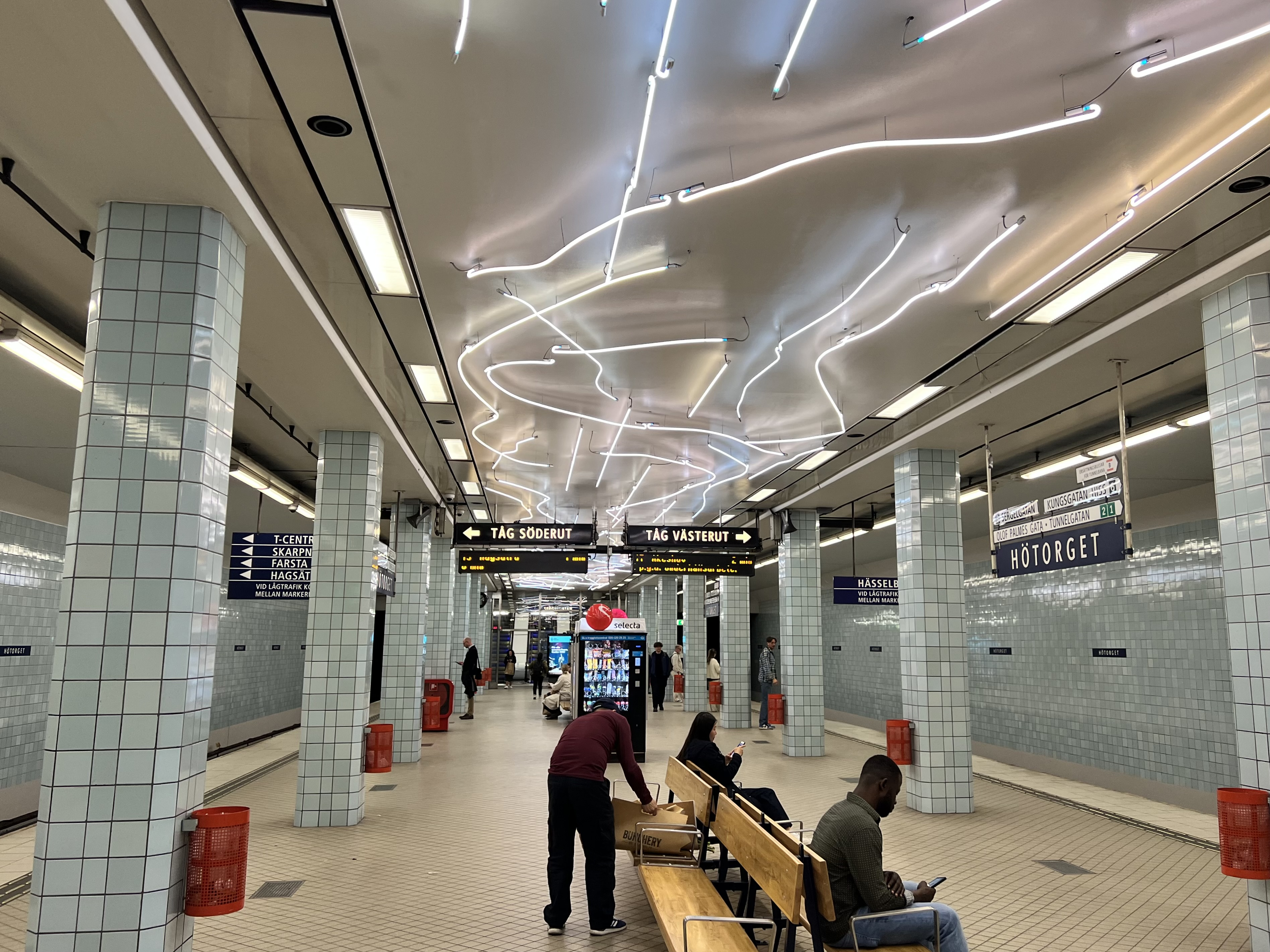
- Station platform, 2025

General information
- Coordinates: 59°20′05″N 18°03′43″E
- System: Stockholm Metro station
- Owner: Storstockholms Lokaltrafik
- Platforms: 1 island platform
- Tracks: 2

Construction
- Structure type: Underground
- Accessible: Yes

Other information
- Station code: HÖT

History
- Opened: 26 October 1952; 74 years ago

Passengers
- 2019: 37,300 boarding per weekday

Services
Preceding station	Stockholm Metro	Following station
Rådmansgatan towards Åkeshov	Line 17	T-Centralen towards Skarpnäck
Rådmansgatan towards Alvik	Line 18	T-Centralen towards Farsta strand
Rådmansgatan towards Hässelby strand	Line 19	T-Centralen towards Hagsätra
Location
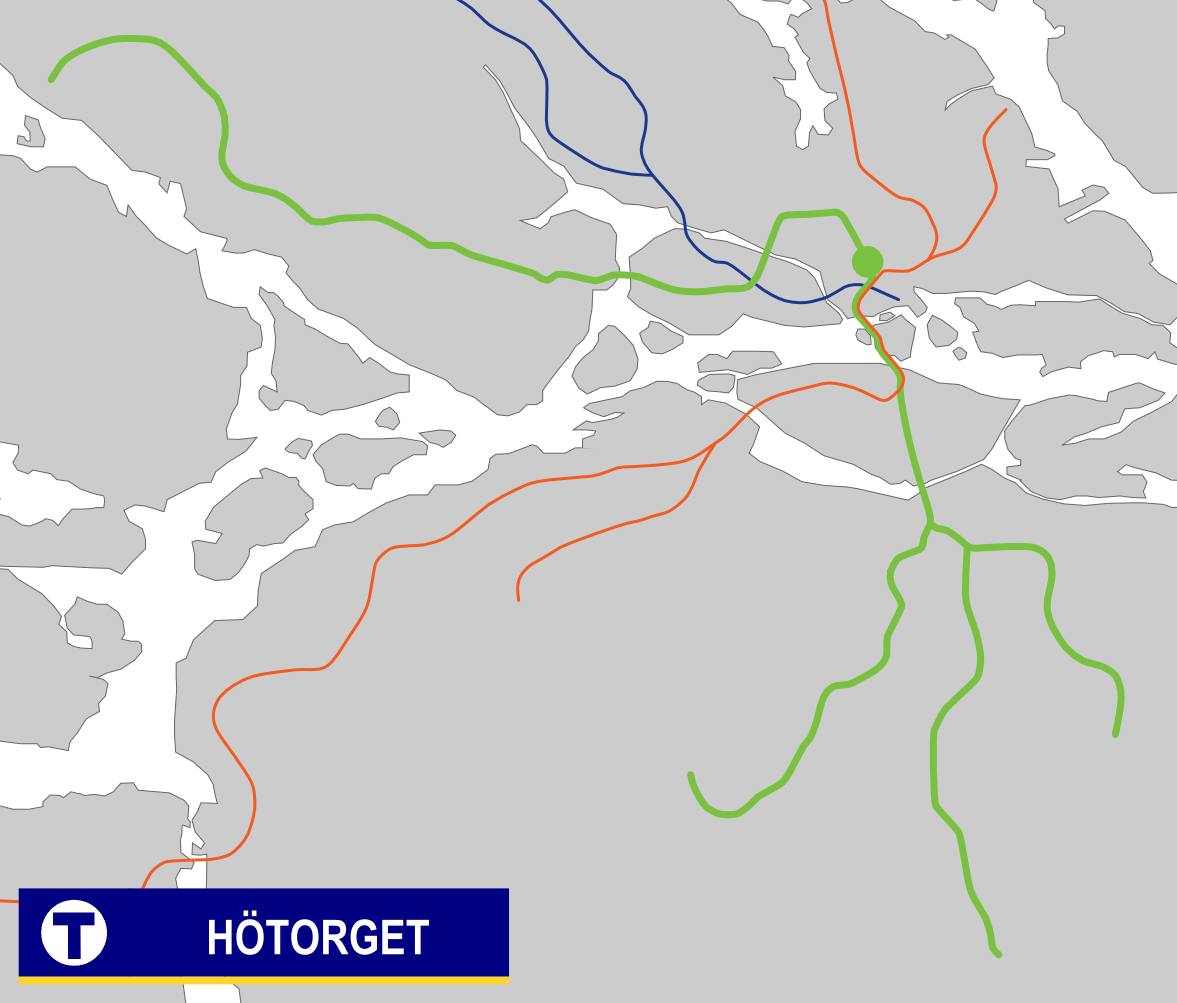

Hötorget is an underground station on the Green Line of the Stockholm Metro. It is situated near to Hötorget, a square in the borough of Norrmalm in central Stockholm, and lies below Sveavägen between its junctions with Oxtorgsgatan and Apelbergsgatan. The station has three entrances, one at each end and one in the middle from Kungsgatan. The central entrance includes an underground square with several shops and stores. The distance to Slussen is 1.5 km (0.93 mi).

Formerly known as Kungsgatan, the station was inaugurated on 26 October 1952 as the east terminus of the stretch between Hötorget and Vällingby. The line was extended to Slussen on 24 November 1957, thereby connecting west and east sections of the green line. It was called Kungsgatan until 1957. The name was changed to Hötorget when the southern and western tracks were joined as one (by the opening of the stations T-Centralen and Gamla stan through the central city).

The station's original 1950s signage and decor have been deliberately retained. As part of Art in the Stockholm metro project, 103 white neon strips have been installed in the platform ceiling. These were executed by Gun Gordillo and date from 1998.

== Gallery ==
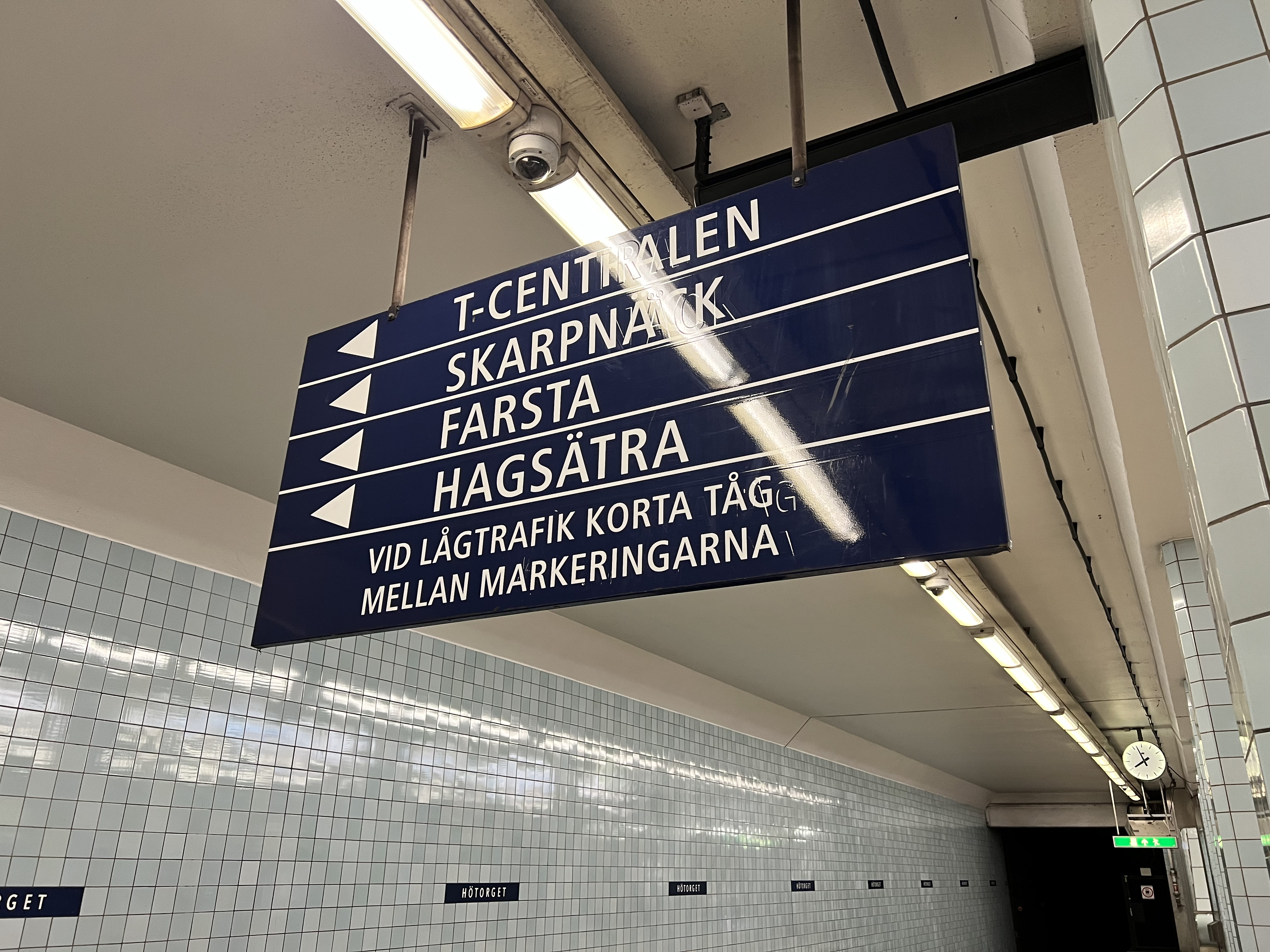
Southbound direction signs at the station, 2025

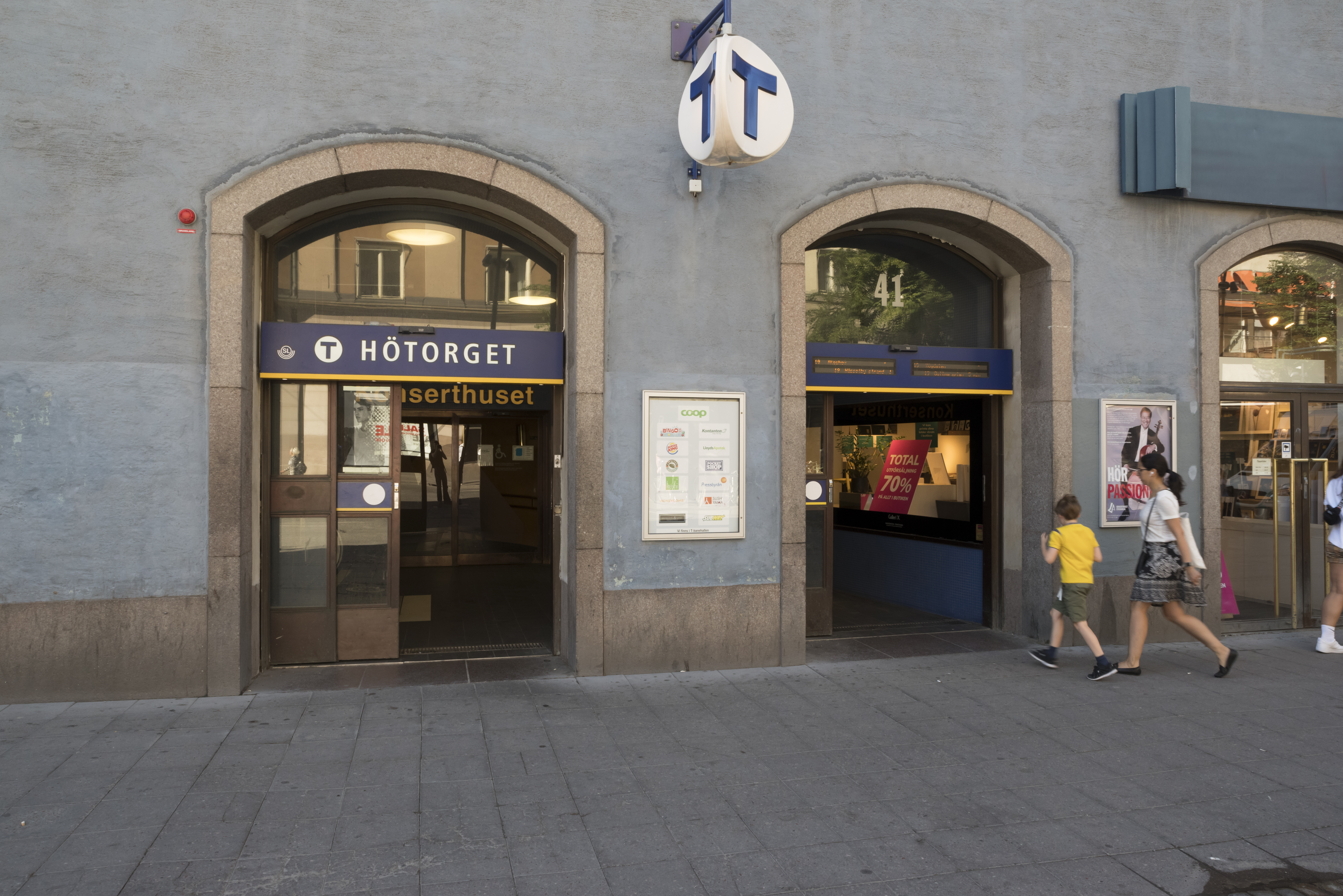
A station entrance, 2018

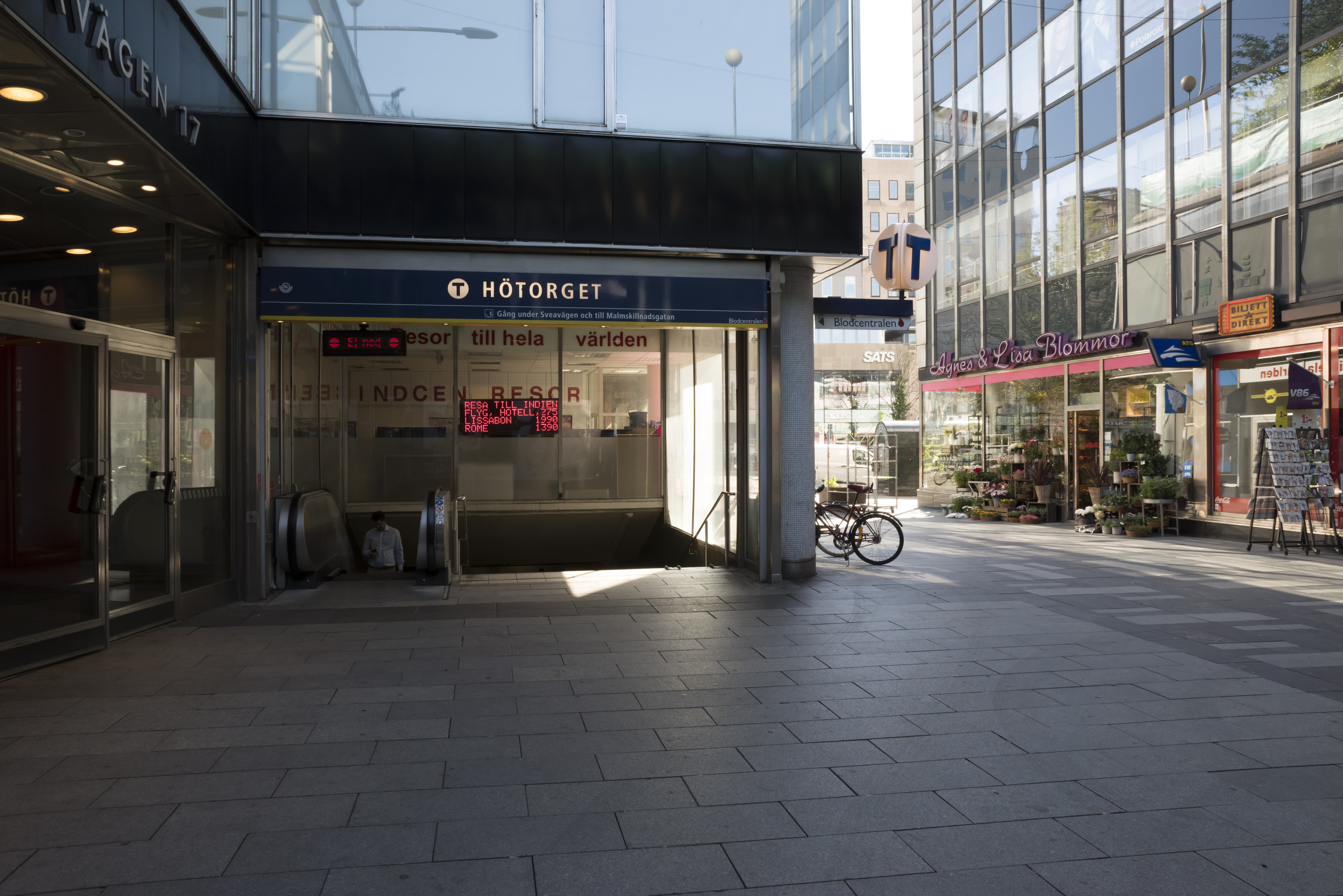
Another station entrance, 2018

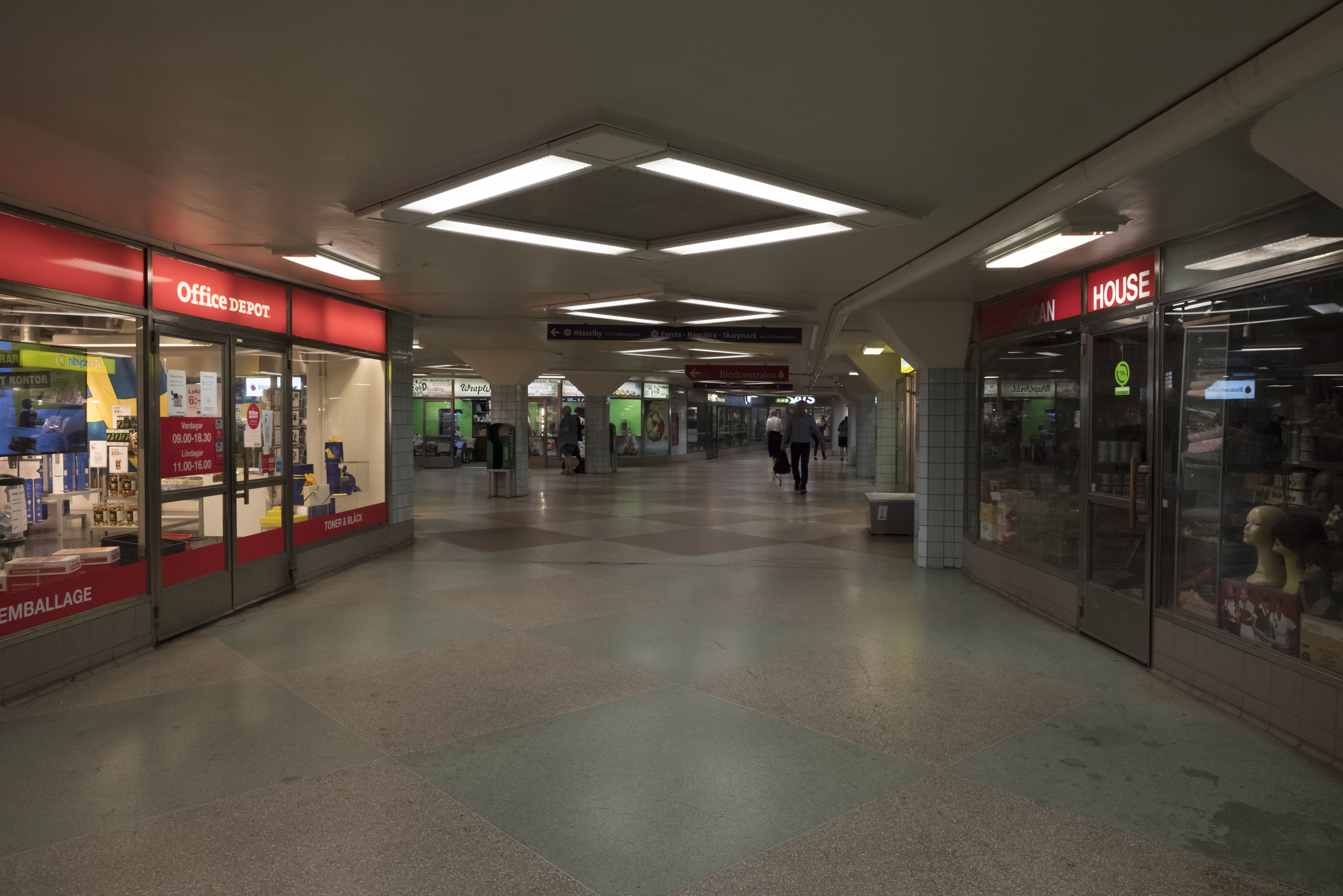
Shops in station entrance, 2018

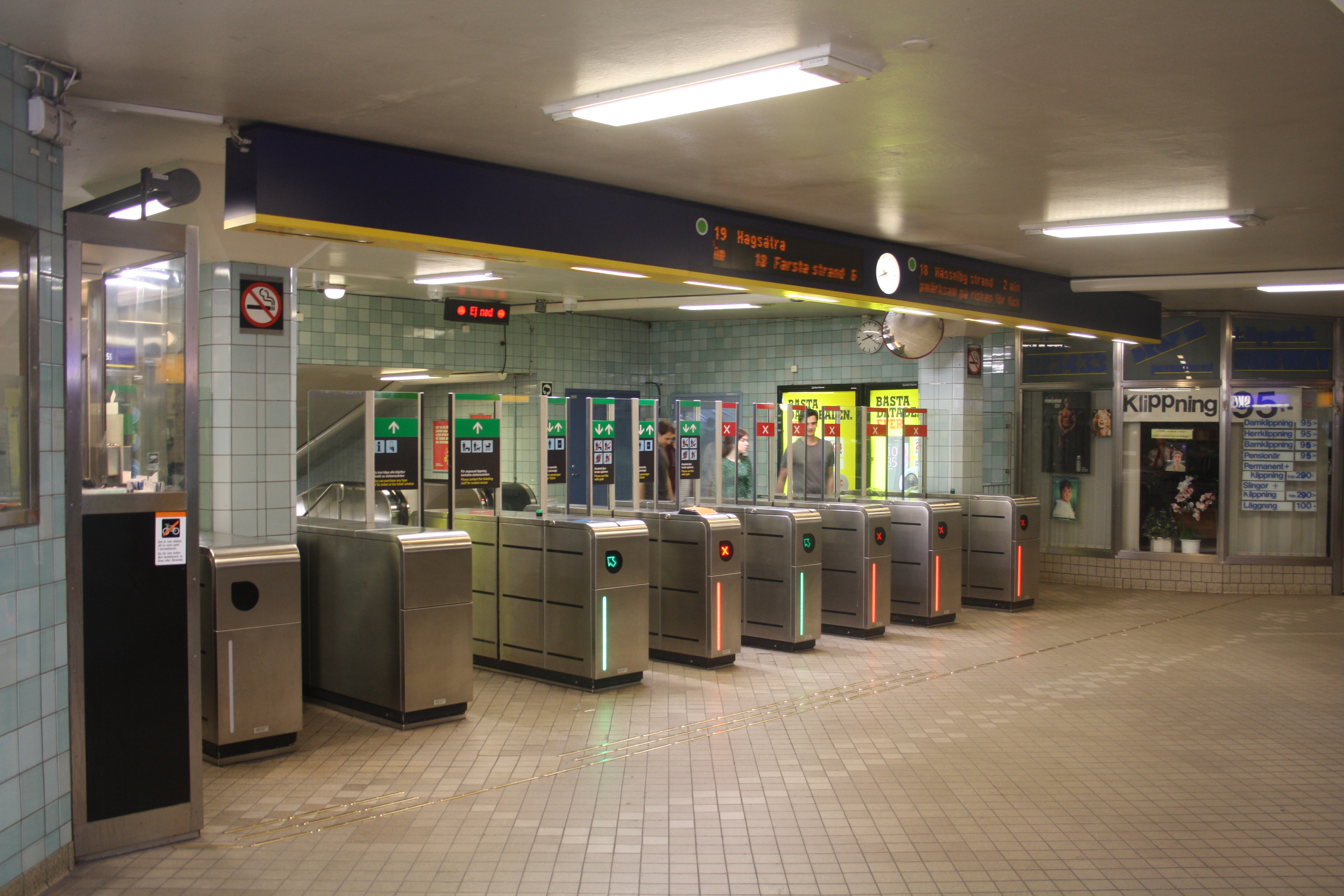
Ticket barriers, 2016

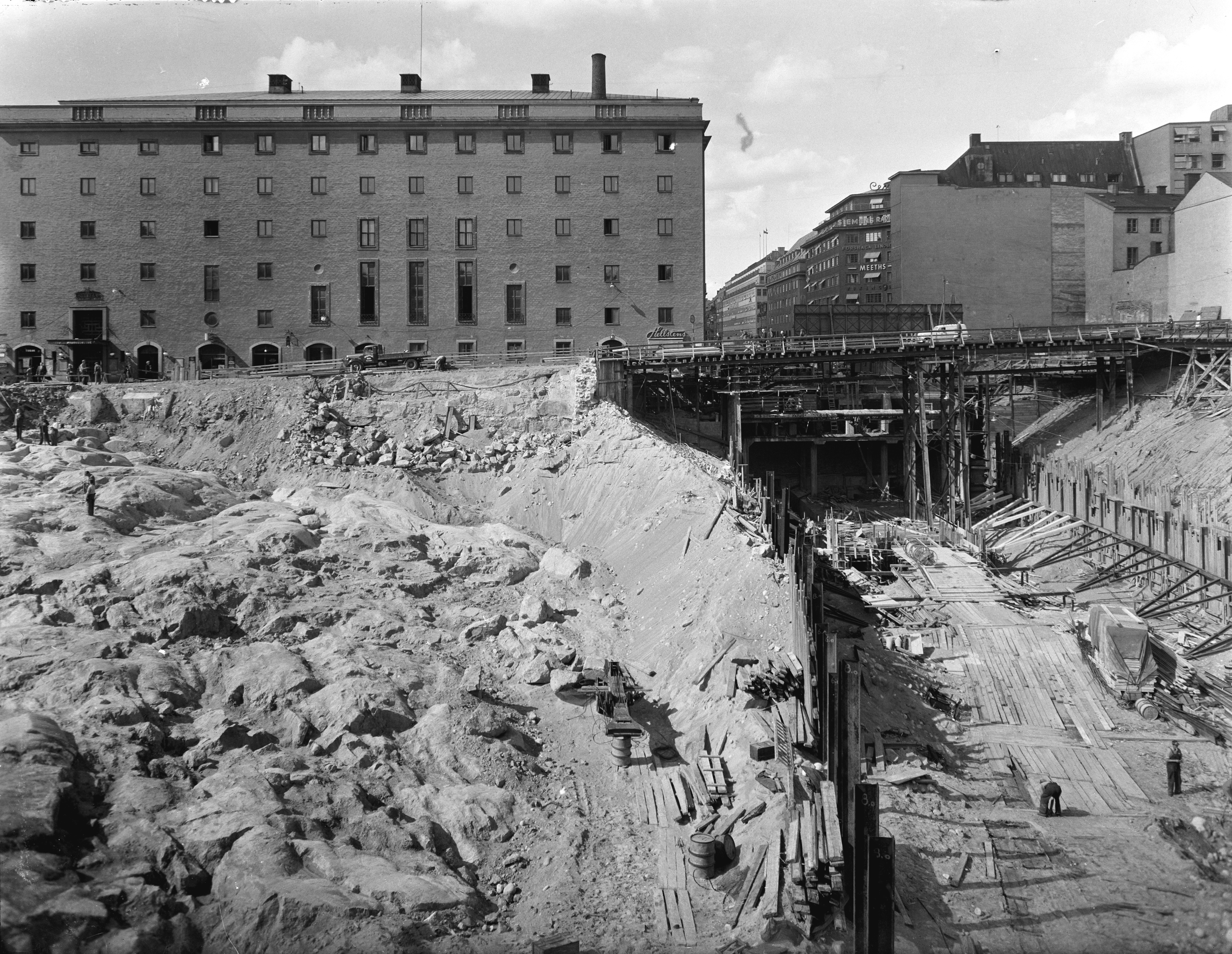
Station tunnelling, 1954
