= Rådmansgatan, Stockholm =

Street in Östermalm and Vasastaden, Stockholm, Sweden

Coordinates: 59°20′38.8″N 18°4′20.3″E

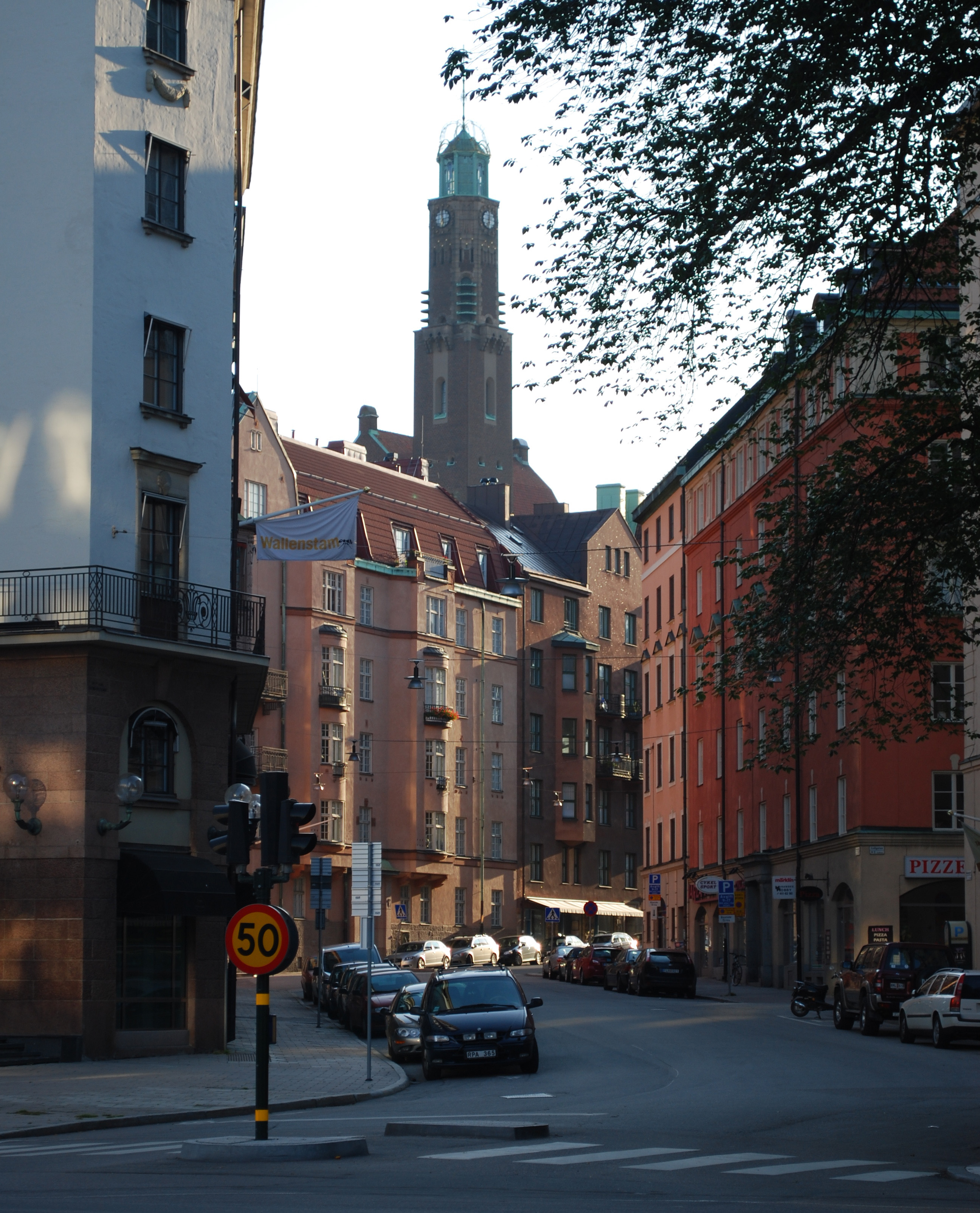
Rådmansgatan in a northeasterly direction as seen from Birger Jarlsgatan. The Engelbrekt Church is visible in the background.

Rådmansgatan is a street in the districts of Östermalm and Vasastaden in the inner city of Stockholm, Sweden.

The Rådmansgatan metro station is located at the intersection of Rådmansgatan with Sveavägen.
