= Rådmansgatan metro station =

Stockholm Metro station

Rådmansgatan
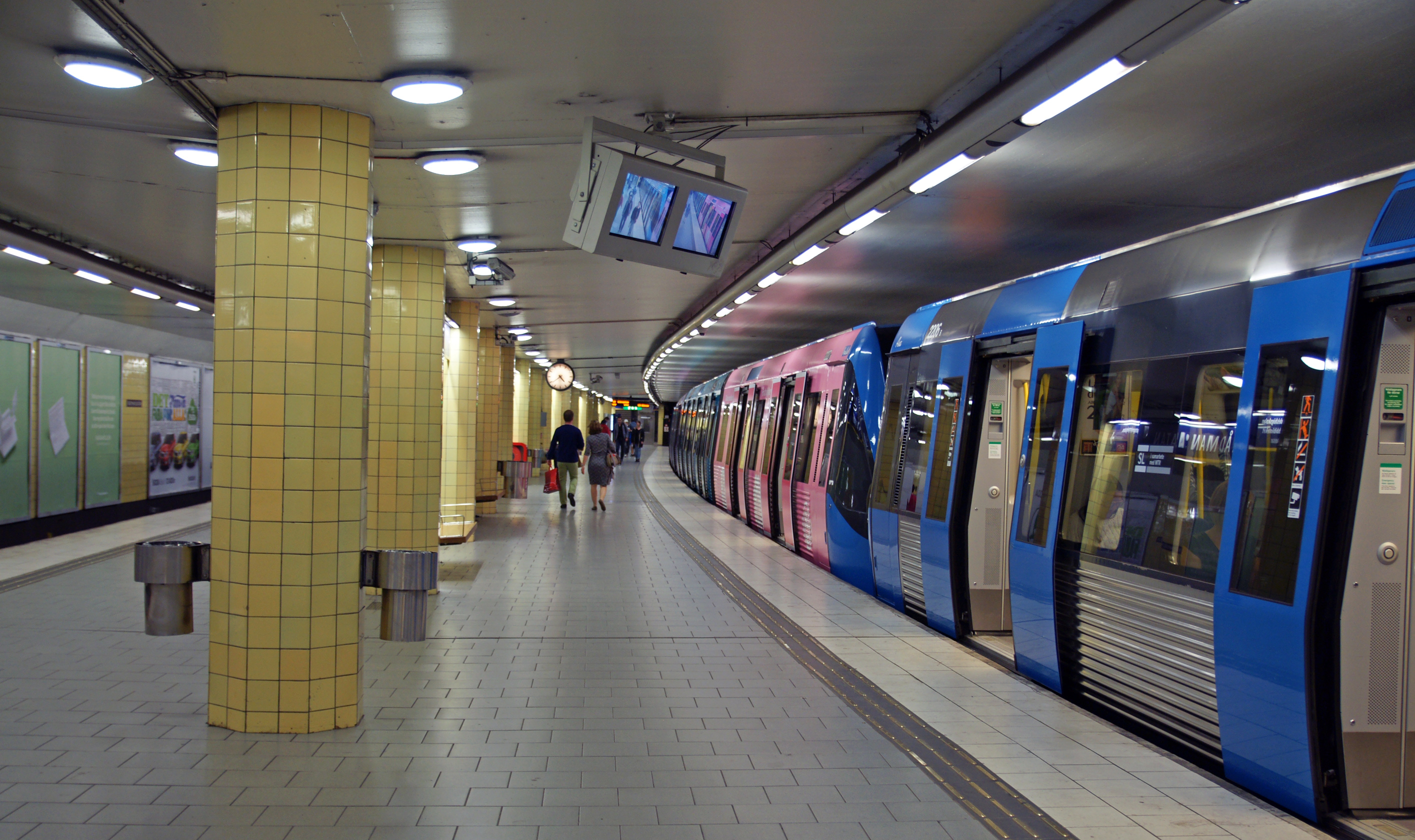
- Station platform, 2012

General information
- Location: Sweden
- Coordinates: 59°20′25″N 18°03′31″E
- System: Stockholm Metro station
- Owner: Storstockholms Lokaltrafik
- Platforms: 1 island platform
- Tracks: 2

Construction
- Structure type: Underground
- Depth: ~8 m (26 ft)
- Accessible: Yes

Other information
- Station code: RMG

History
- Opened: 26 October 1952; 73 years ago

Passengers
- 2019: 27,800 boarding per weekday

Services
Preceding station	Stockholm Metro	Following station
Odenplan towards Åkeshov	Line 17	Hötorget towards Skarpnäck
Odenplan towards Alvik	Line 18	Hötorget towards Farsta strand
Odenplan towards Hässelby strand	Line 19	Hötorget towards Hagsätra
Location
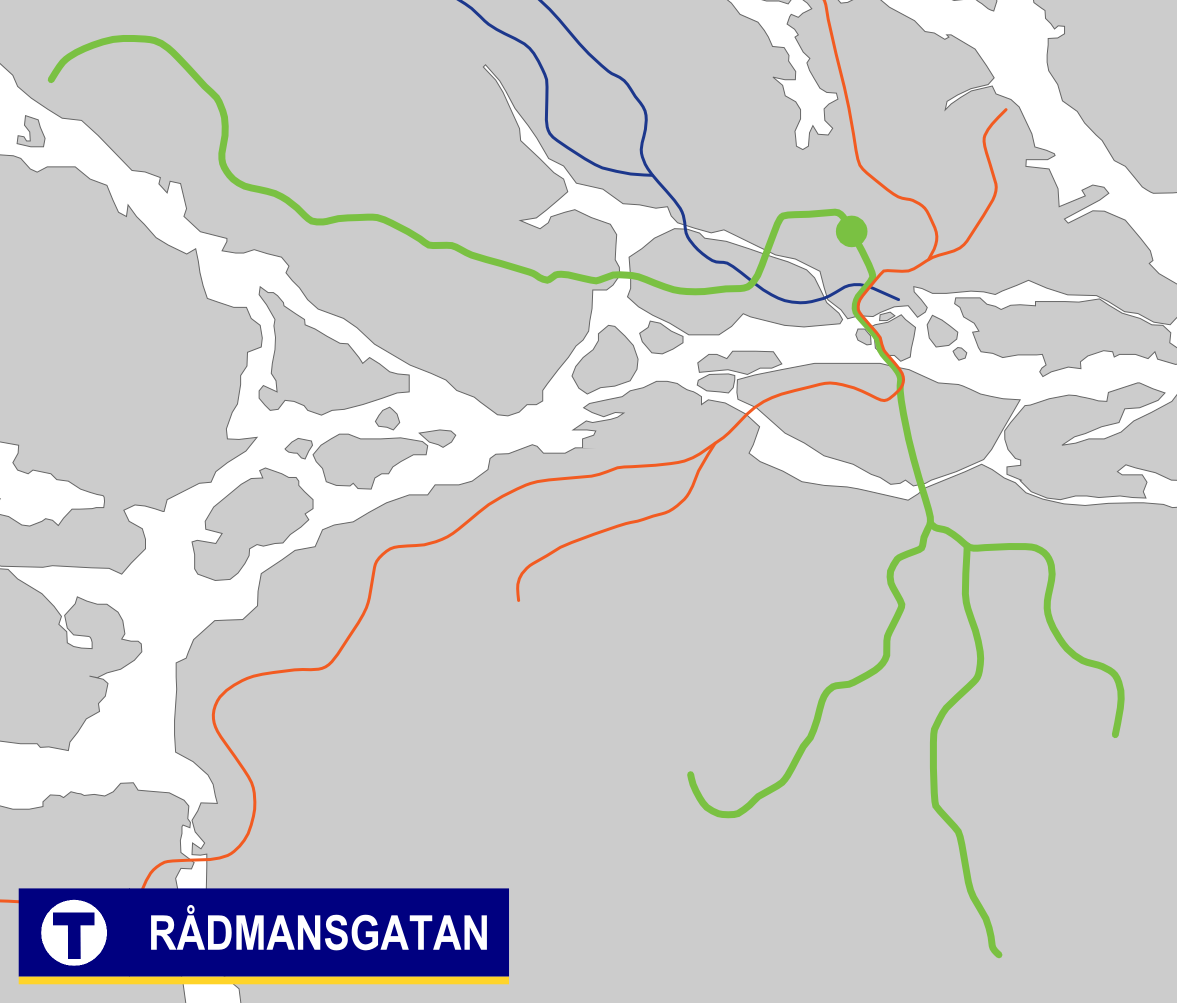

Rådmansgatan is an underground station on the Green Line of the Stockholm Metro. It lies below Sveavägen between its junctions with Rådmansgatan and Rehnsgatan in the district of Vasastaden and borough of Norrmalm in central Stockholm. The station has a single island platform, some 8 metres (26 ft) below street level, and is accessed via a pair of ticket halls at each end of the station. The ticket halls are accessed via staircases and lifts from the street above.

The station was opened on 26 October 1952 as a part of the Green Line section between Hötorget and Vällingby.

The station is decorated with yellow tiles. As part of Art in the Stockholm metro project, the southern entrance to the station, close to the Strindberg Museum, has enamel works dedicated to the life of August Strindberg. These were executed by Sture Valentin Nilsson and date from 1983.

== Gallery ==
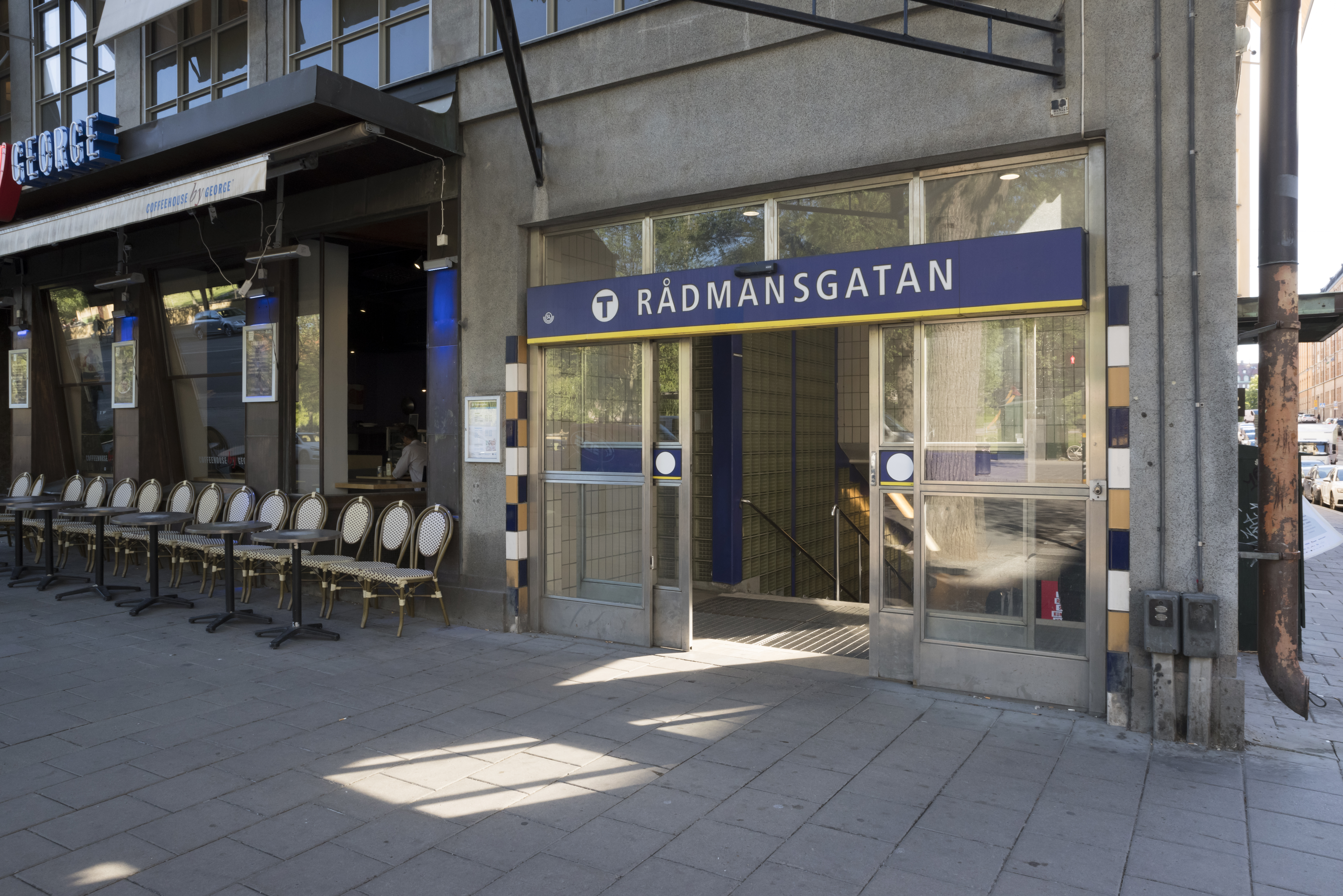
One of the entrances, 2018

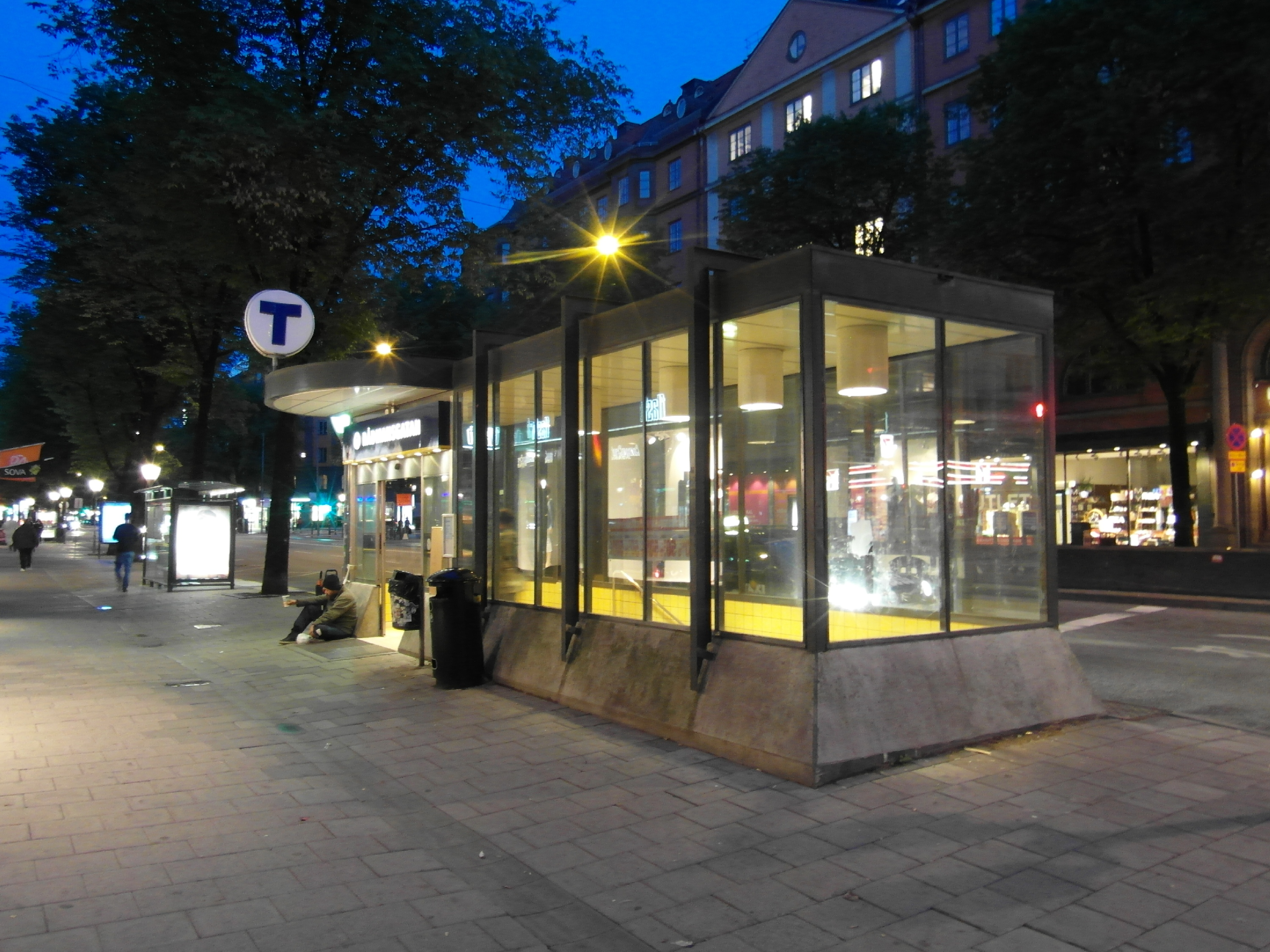
Another entrance, 2013

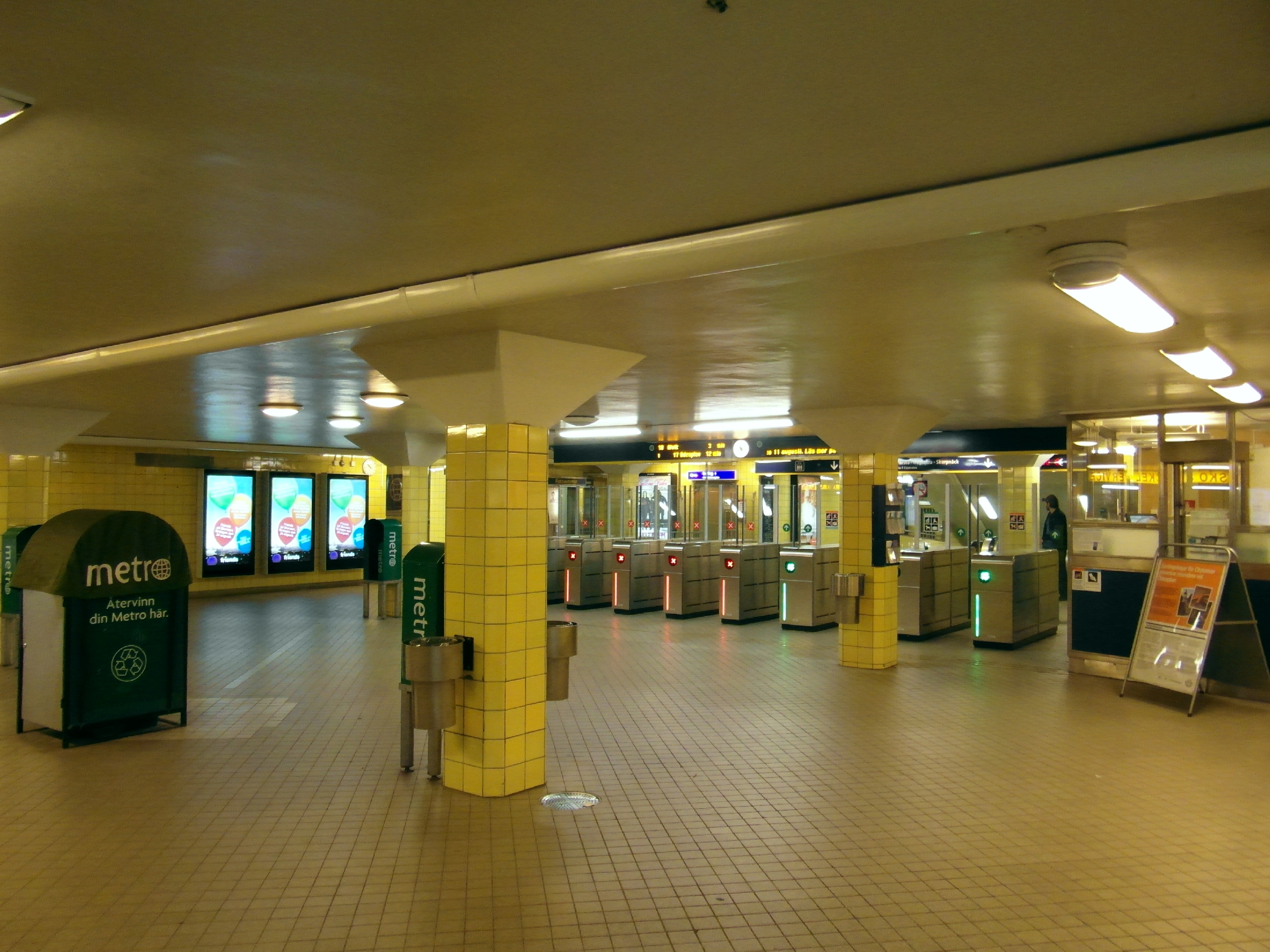
Ticket barriers, 2013

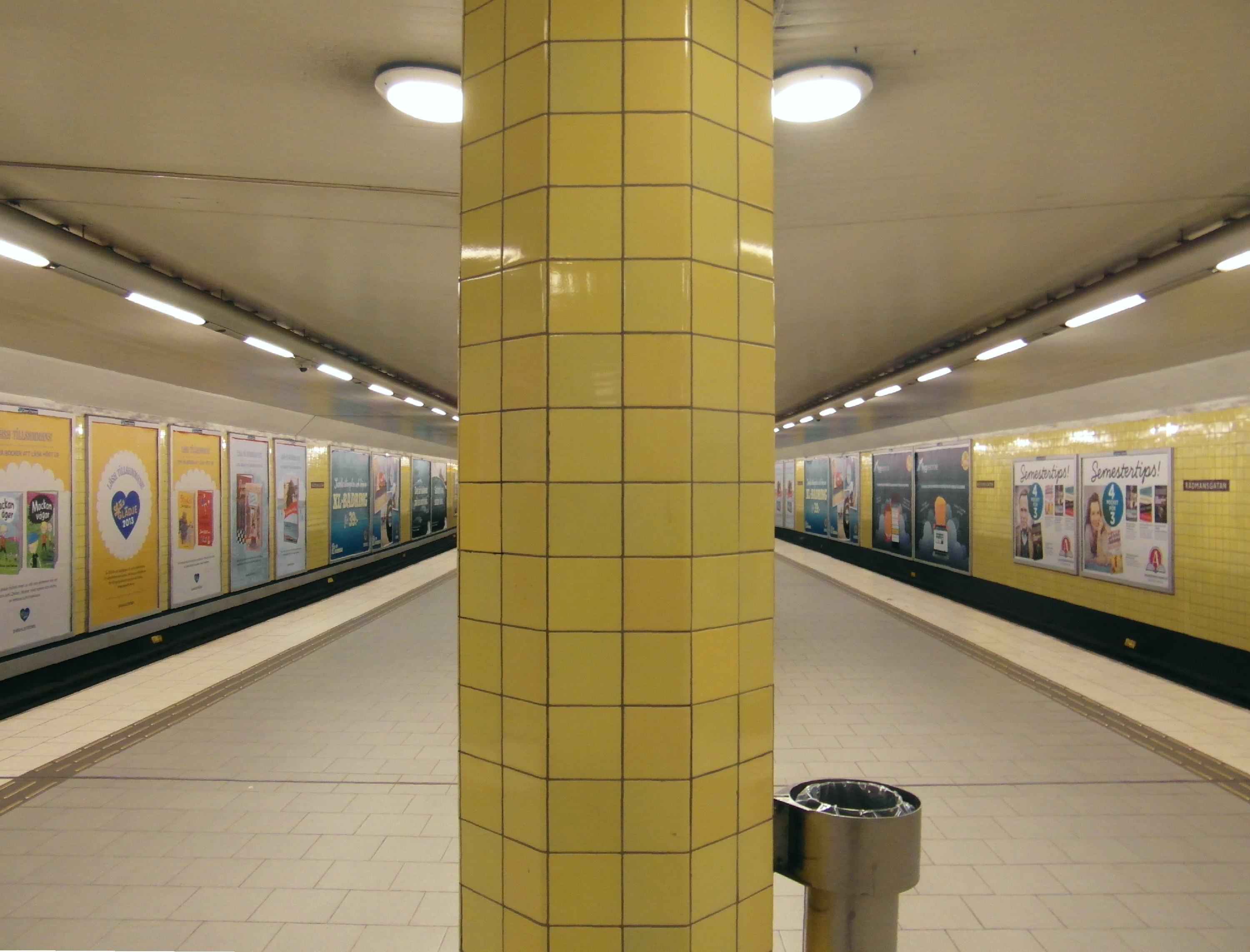
On the platform, 2013
