= Edvin Öhrström =

Swedish artist (1906–1994)

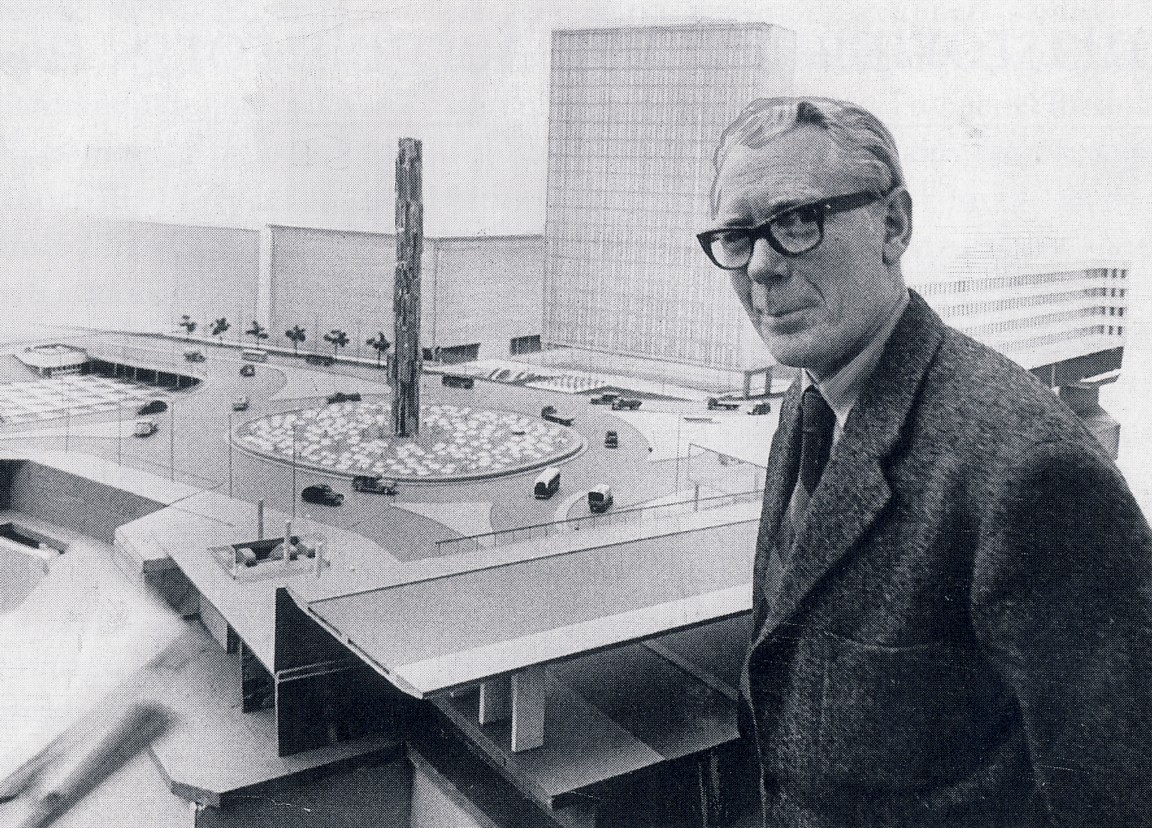
Edvin Öhrström with a model of the glass obelisk (Kristallvertikalaccent) at Sergels torg, Stockholm, 1964

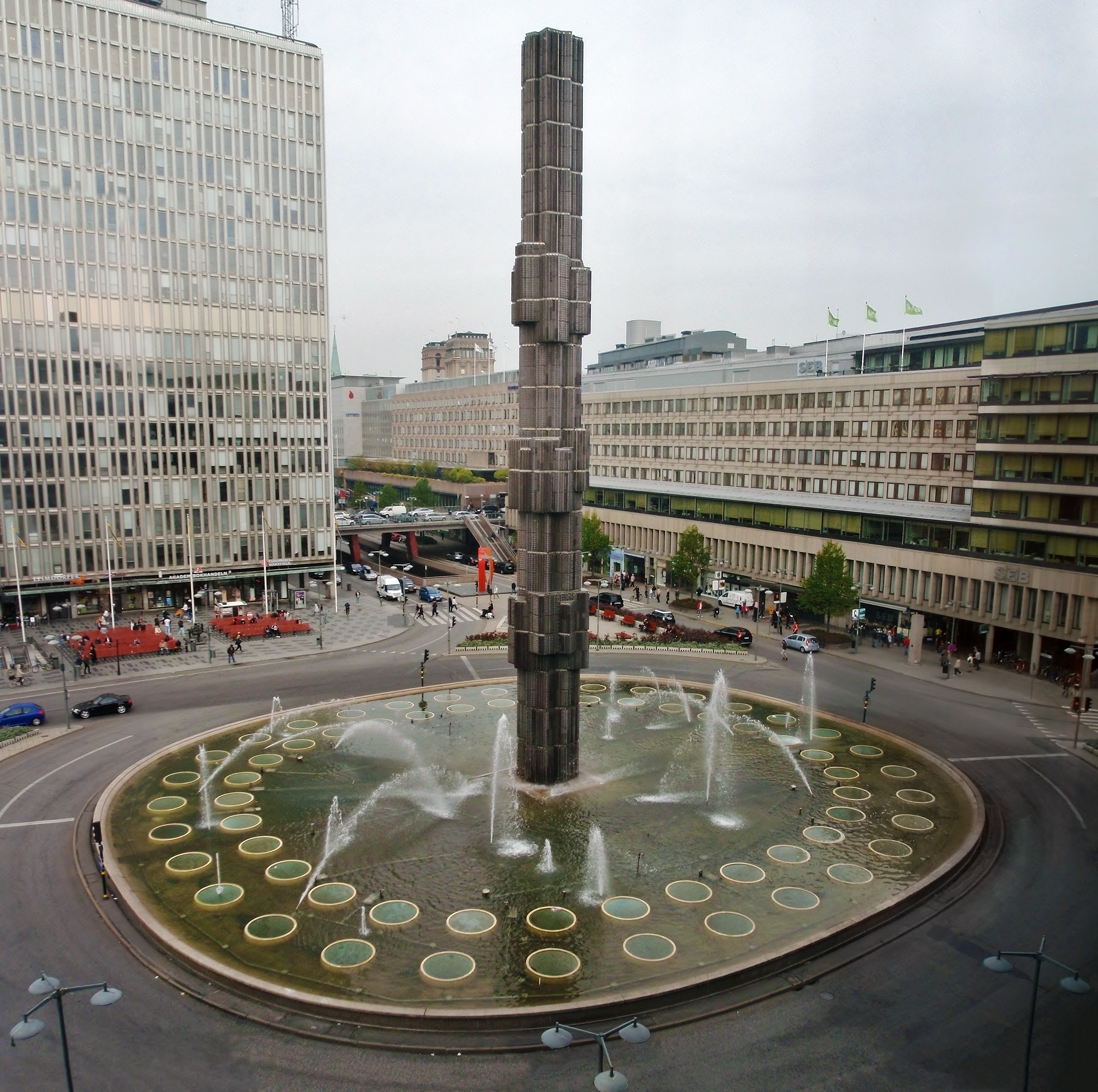
Kristallvertikalaccent in 2011

Karl Edvin Öhrström (August 22, 1906 – December 2, 1994) was a Swedish sculptor and glass artist noted for the glass obelisk at Sergels torg, Stockholm.

== Biography ==
Born in Burlöv, he grew up in Halmstad; his father worked for the railroad. He began to work as a railroad worker, then trained to become an art teacher at Tekniska skolan (current Konstfack) in Stockholm from 1925 to 1928, and studied at the sculptural department at the Royal University College of Fine Arts in Stockholm from 1928 to 1931, with Carl Milles and Nils Sjögren as teachers. From 1932 to 1957, he worked two months per year at Orrefors Glasbruk in Orrefors.

He often used a technique, the ariel technique, which he had invented together with the master Gustaf Bergkvist and the artist Vicke Lindstrand. Later, he worked at Lindshammars Glasbruk, where he developed his sculptures with prisms of gemstone colors which play with light reflections and refractions in the glass.

Edvin Öhrstrom won a contest for the decoration of Sergels torg in Stockholm, with a 37.5 metres high steel construction with 80,000 glass prisms, lit from within. The 130 tonnes heavy glass pillar, Kristallvertikalaccent, is made from steel and covered with glass from Lindshammars Glasbruk and was inaugurated in 1974. The light source is four lamps inside the pillar. He was awarded the Prince Eugen Medal for sculpture in 1979.
