= Sergels torg =

Public square in central Stockholm

Coordinates: 59°19′57″N 18°03′52″E

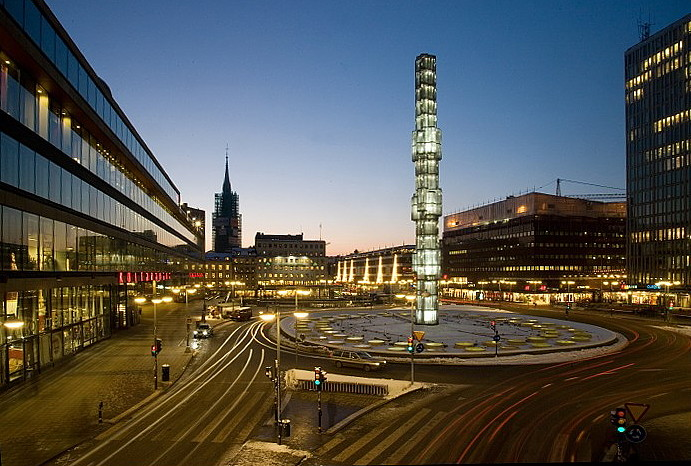
Sergels torg viewed from Malmskillnadsgatan with Kulturhuset and Stockholm City Theatre (to the left) at night

Sergels torg ("Sergel's Square") is a major public square in Stockholm, Sweden, constructed in the 1960s and named after 18th-century sculptor Johan Tobias Sergel, whose workshop was once located north of the square.

== Overview ==
Sergels torg has a dominant west-to-east axis and is divided into three distinct parts:

1. A sunken pedestrian plaza furnished with a triangular-colored floor pattern (colloquially referred to as Plattan, "The Slab") and a wide flight of stairs leading up to the pedestrian street Drottninggatan, connecting south to Stockholm Old Town and north to Kungsgatan. The triangular pattern of the square is featured on the seats of C30 and refurbished C20 trains of the Stockholm Metro.
2. This plaza is partly overbuilt by a roundabout centered on a glass obelisk and by the concrete decks of three major streets.
3. North of this traffic junction is a considerably smaller open space overlooked by the high-rise façade of the fifth Hötorget Building from where the avenue Sveavägen extends north.

The site south of the square is taken up by the cultural centre Kulturhuset, which also harbours the Stockholm City Theatre and hides the Bank of Sweden headquarters facing the square Brunkebergstorg behind. The street Klarabergsgatan leads west past the department store Åhléns City and Klara Church to the Klaraberg Viaduct and Kungsholmen. Hamngatan leads east under Malmskillnadsgatan to Kungsträdgården, Norrmalmstorg, and Strandvägen. Together with the underground mall east of the pedestrian plaza and the T-Centralen metro station and other continuous underpasses west thereof, Sergels torg forms part of a continuous underground structure almost a kilometre in length.

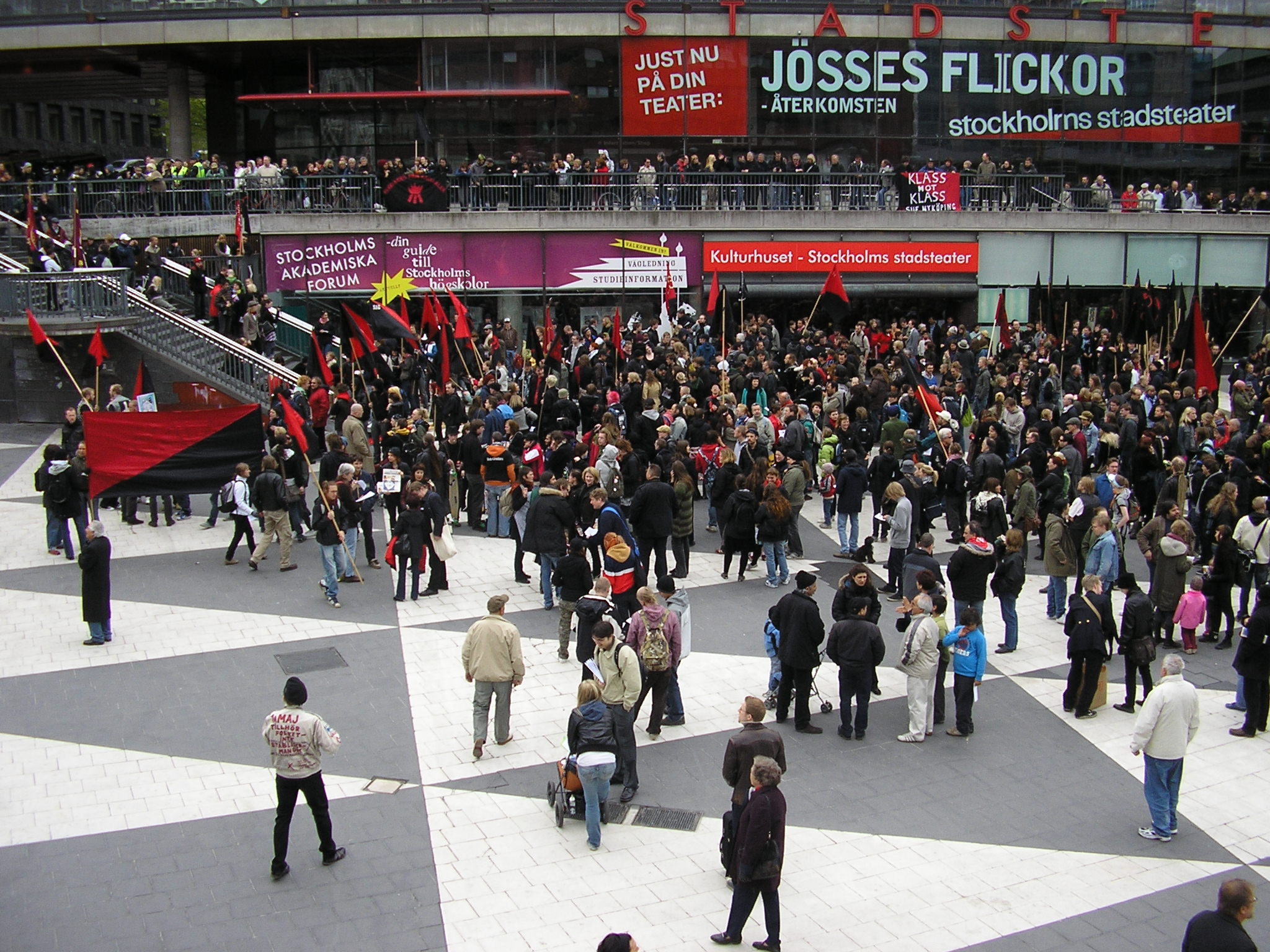
A May Day demonstration

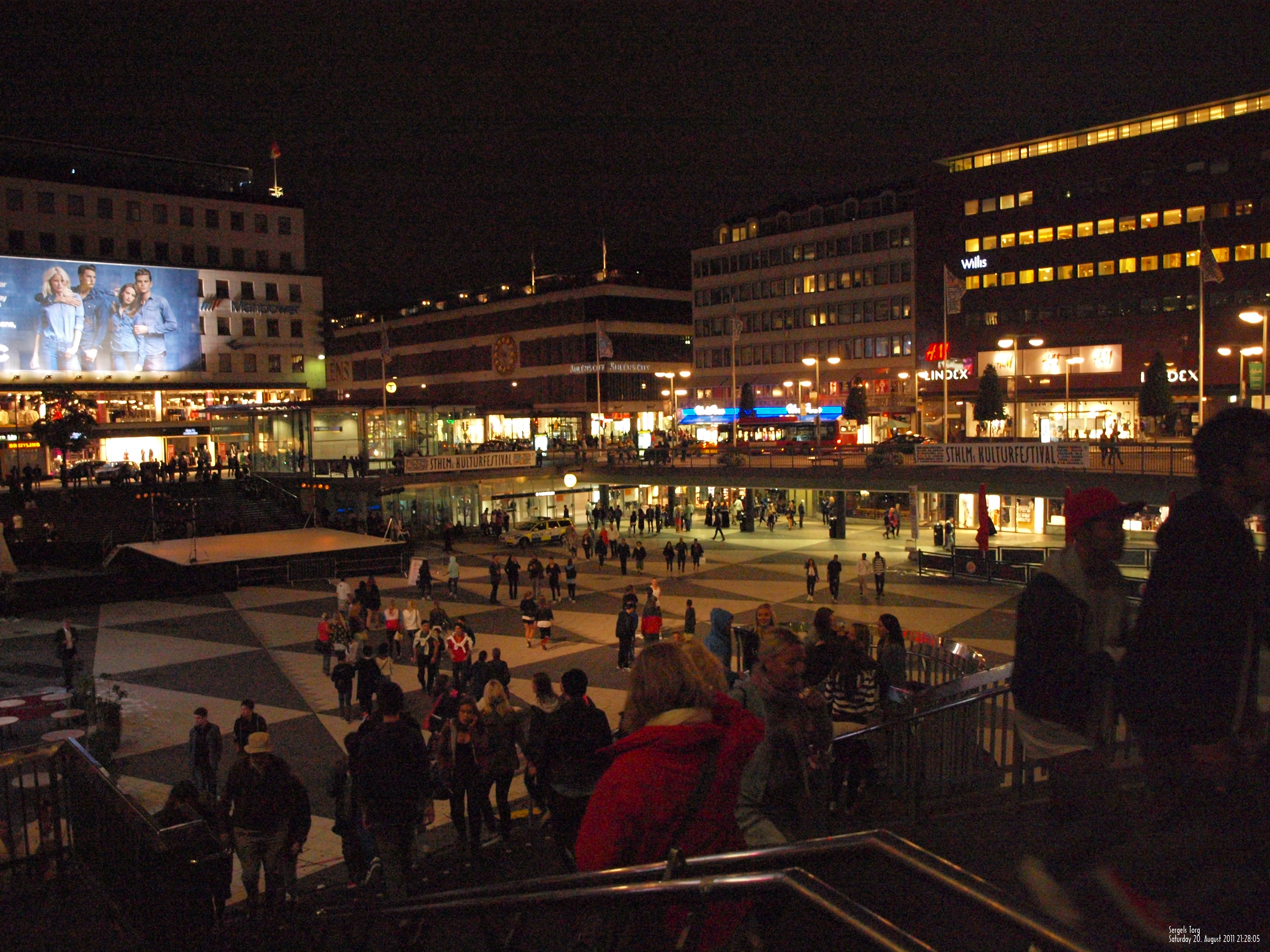
The Stockholm Kulturfestival (2011)

Since its creation, Sergels torg has been criticized for giving priority to cars at the cost of pedestrians. It has, among some quarters, become the main target for criticism of the much debated demolition of the central city district of Klara during the 1950s and 1960s. Nevertheless, it is not dissimilar to but larger than the public space in front of Centre Georges Pompidou in Paris and much like its French counterpart, it remains a popular space in Stockholm for meeting friends, for political demonstrations, for a wide range of events, and for drug-dealers. This includes the fountain, in which people celebrate major victories by Swedish sports teams.

== History ==
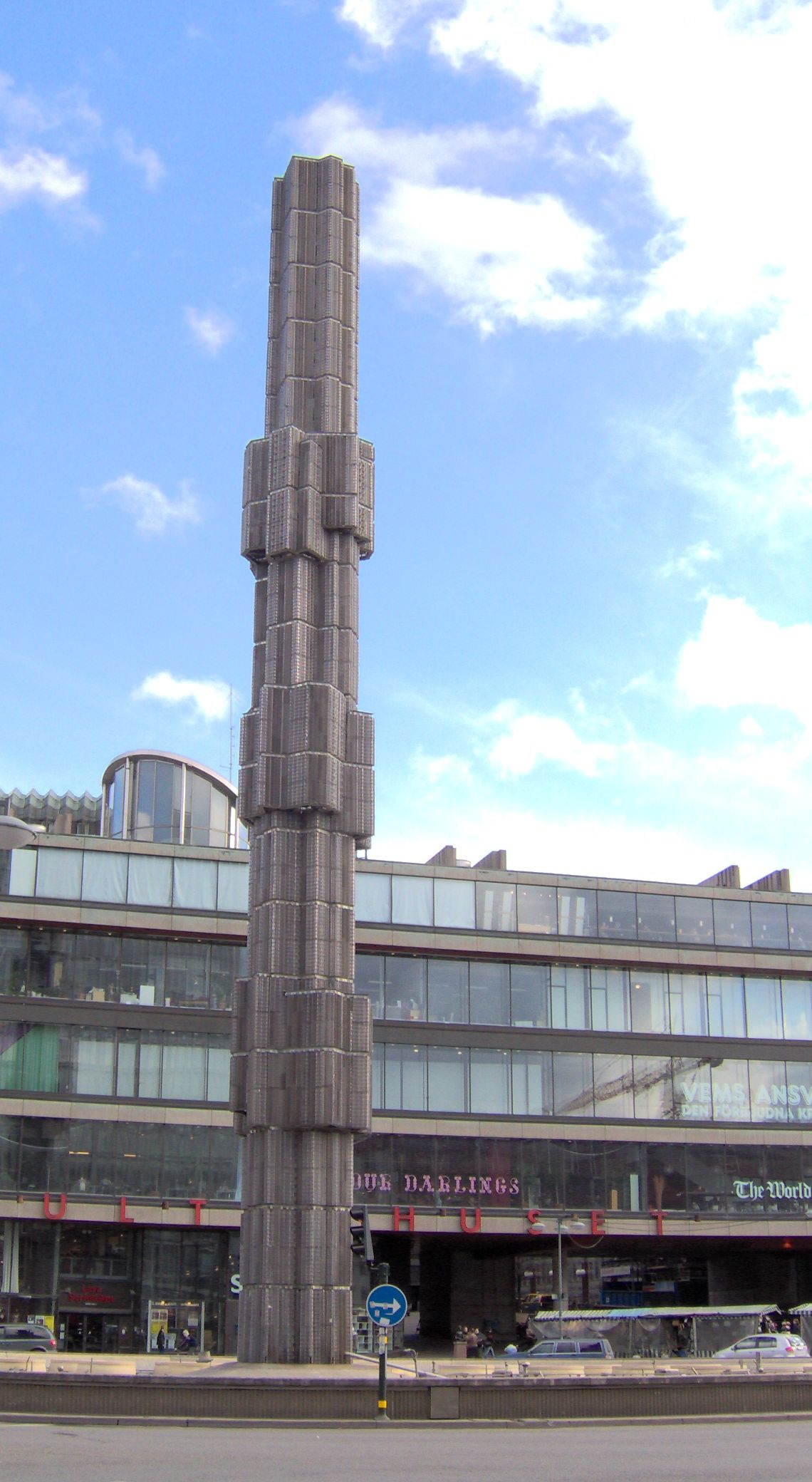
Crystal – vertical accent in glass and steel, by Edvin Öhrström

The construction of the square was completed in 1967. Before the creation of Sergels torg, Brunkebergstorg was the most important public space in the area, the hub about which traffic revolved, the place where people would go to work and to find entertainment.

=== Early proposals ===
Albert Lilienberg was appointed city-planning superintendent in 1927, and a year later he produced the first proposal for a public square on the location in his general plan of 1928. In his proposal he envisioned a square whose north-south oriented axis would line-up with Sveavägen intended to be extended south across the square down to the waterfront with widened Hamngatan and Klarabergsgatan joining in from west and east. After this first proposal, the square is featured on every subsequent city plan produced for the area, with alternations in width and length. Notwithstanding the considerable number of revised proposals produced, surprisingly few were preoccupied by architectonic considerations, instead focusing on optimization of traffic flow.

In the city plan Helldén produced in 1946, the square, still named Sveaplatsen ("Swede Plaza"), was conceived as similar to the present square, but still remained an unarticulated modernistic concept. In this proposal, the square was centred on a rectangular open space furnished with trees, benches, and ponds; a space reached by subways stretching under the surrounding roundabout. During the 1950s, continuously increasing traffic loads made separating pedestrians and car traffic desirable, and several studies produced around 1955 focused on a lower level for pedestrians with cars on street-level with various openings to allow light down to the pedestrians.

=== Final proposal ===
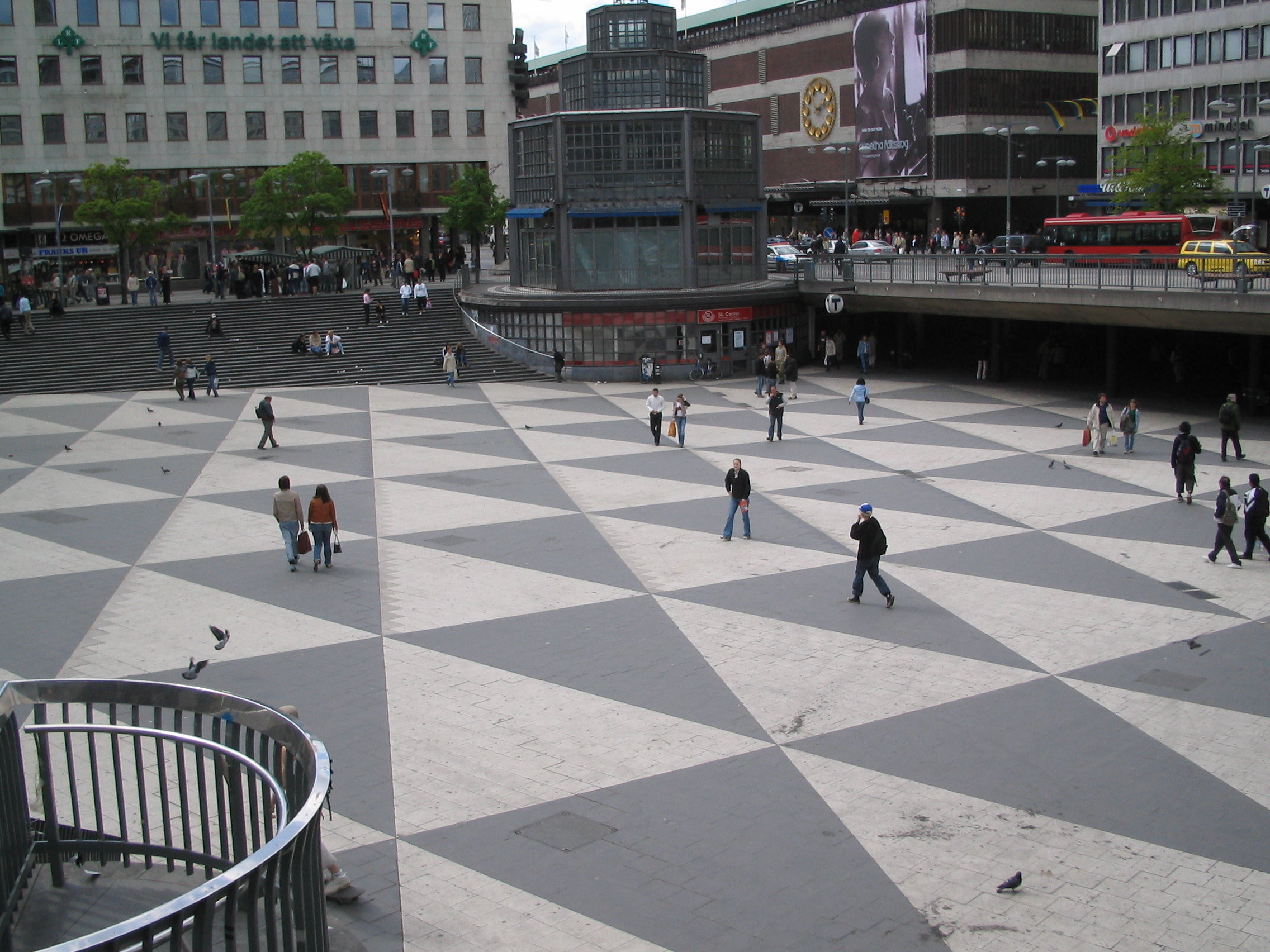
The iconic triangular pattern of the pedestrian plaza. The hexagonal building, a 1990 coffeehouse (sv), was removed in 2004 in favor of a street level entrance to the metro station.

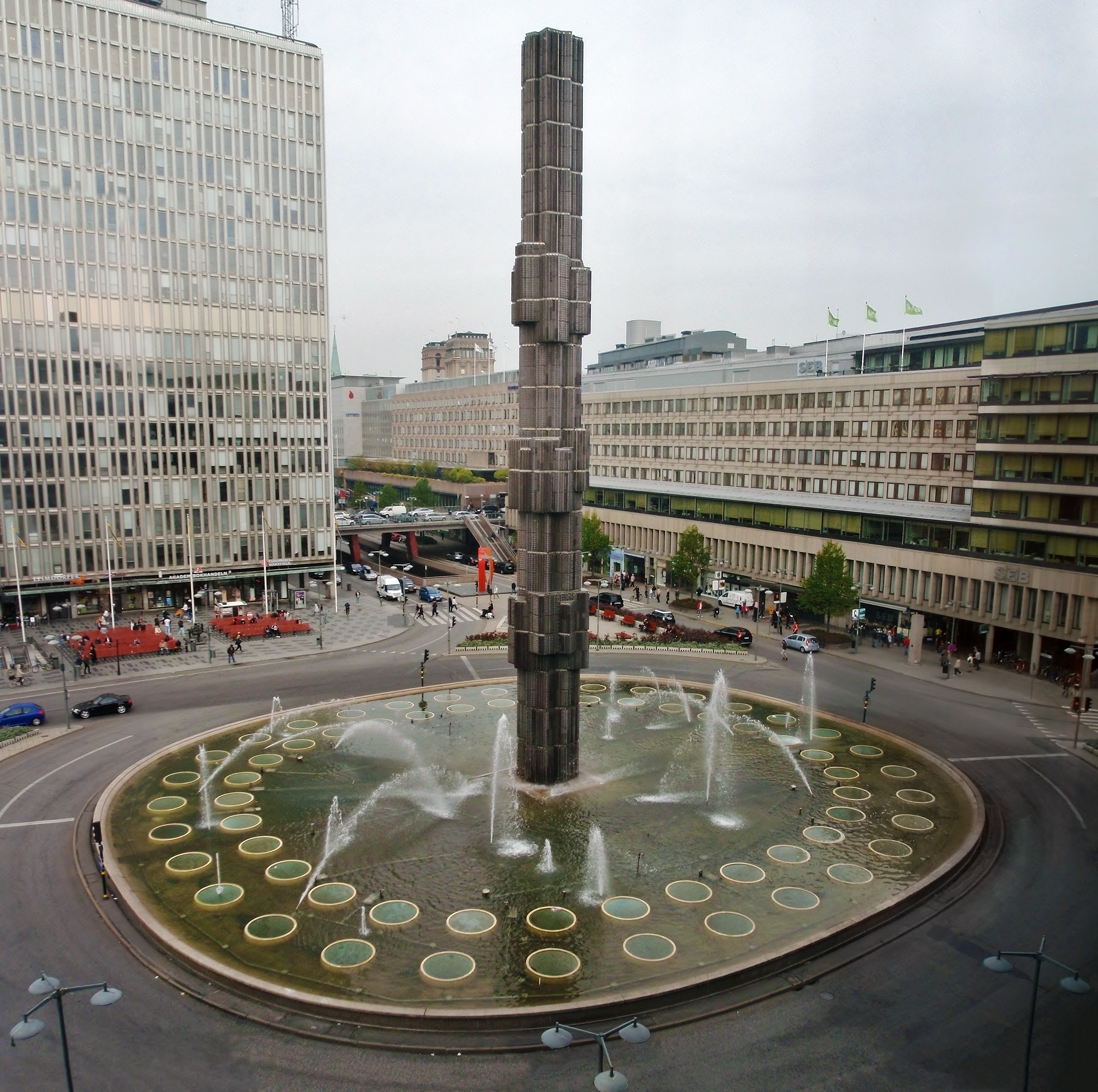
The superellipse-shaped fountain

In 1957, a first official proposal presented a square virtually similar to the present; except that instead of the fountain there was an opening with tall trees and on the western side, where the flight of stairs is today, was a building standing on pillars. The Chamber of Commerce was critical of the concept, concluding pedestrians on a lower level would produce poor business sites, an analysis which would eventually prove correct. Their own proposal the following year, developed together with various authorities, reserved street-level to pedestrians while cars were confined below ground. This counter-proposal was however produced in only two months, which made it easy for opponents to pin-down its weaknesses (mostly a failure to leave enough space for the metro which was being constructed at this time). Nevertheless, Helldén's proposal failed to impress the city as well, and Helldén together with other hand-picked experts was therefore sent on a tour around Europe, including Coventry and London, to find a better solution. In Stuttgart they could conclude that having pedestrians on a lower level required escalators, and in Vienna the pedestrian underpass Opernpassage gave them the inspiration to replace the central open space at Sveaplatsen with a round restaurant with glass walls, an aesthetic device intended to give the square an architectonic dignity.

This newly introduced centre-piece resulted in a proposal for a fountain with a monument above it. For the shape of this fountain, Helldén consulted his friend, the mathematician and artist Piet Hein, who in less than in minute found a curve with a "continuously varying bending" and immediately named it the superellipse. Before presenting his final proposal in 1960, Helldén added the triangular pattern to the pedestrian plaza and the wide stairs on its western side.

A contest for the central monument in 1962 was won by Edvin Öhrström, with the 37-metre tall glass obelisk which was named Kristall – vertikal accent i glas och stål ("Crystal – vertical accent in glass and steel"). The sculpture, finally completed in 1974 and since haunted by technical problems, never was able to deliver the intended visual output and – quoting Hall – "thus adds itself to the many projects within the [reconstruction of central Stockholm] that didn't endure confrontation with reality." The artist favoured by Helldén, Olle Baertling, started to work on a sculpture for the square in 1960 but never was invited to participate in the contest.

=== Kulturhuset ===
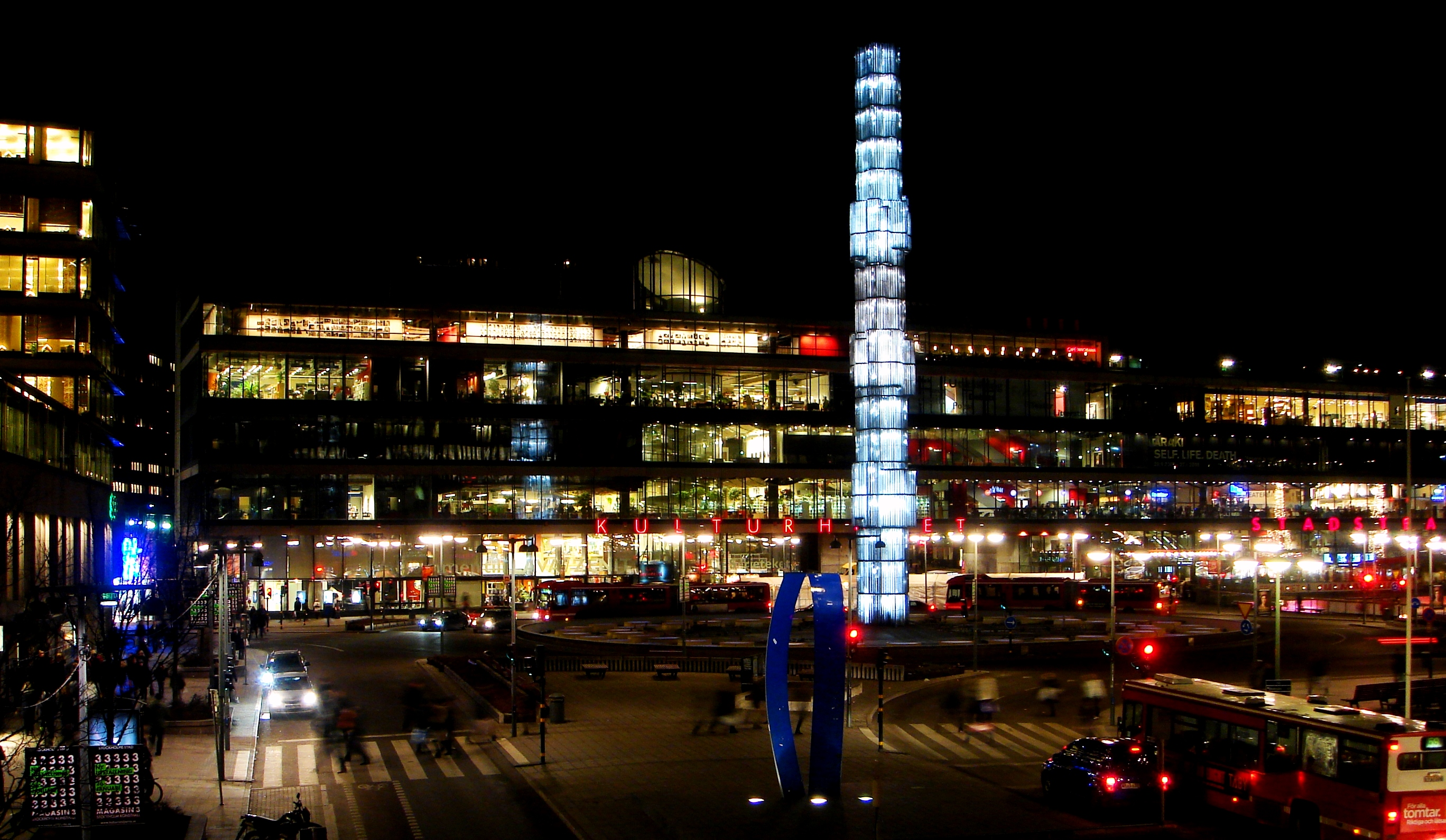
Night view of the obelisk and Kulturhuset

South of the square, intentions were to erect two buildings separated by a street leading to Brunkebergstorg, but the old buildings south of the square turned their gables towards the modernist composition of Helldén throughout most of the 1960s. A contest in 1965 for this area included a cultural centre proposed by Pontus Hultén, the legendary founder of Moderna Museet who wished to see his museum relocated from the isolated island Skeppsholmen. The contest was won by architect Peter Celsing and Kulturhuset was eventually inaugurated in 1974. It basically is a single huge concrete wall from which are consoling shallow stories with glassed façades, a structure Hultén lyrically described as a stage which would "exercise a strong attractive force" by exhibiting people and works of art through the glass façade.

However, considering Stockholm's northern location, to give the sun full access to public spaces is top priority, and Kulturhuset has proven a problematic wall which not only shuts the sun off, but also tends to dominate the square with its large volume. Additionally, Sergels torg is dominated by its traffic roundabout and is hard to experience as a single coherent space. Together with the traffic structure at Slussen, built in the 1930s, Sergels torg is thus an attempt with few parallels in the world, to make public art of a traffic junction dominating the central district of a city. Since the mid-1990s, numerous proposals to rebuild the square have been produced, and the debate regarding the square is likely to continue.

Installation of tramway tracks from Hamngatan to Klarabergsgatan began in 2015 and were completed in 2018.

== See also ==
- Hötorget
- Norrmalm
- History of Stockholm
- Redevelopment of Norrmalm
- Marias enmansorkester
