= Grön eld =

Glass sculpture by Vicke Lindstrand at Järnvägstorget

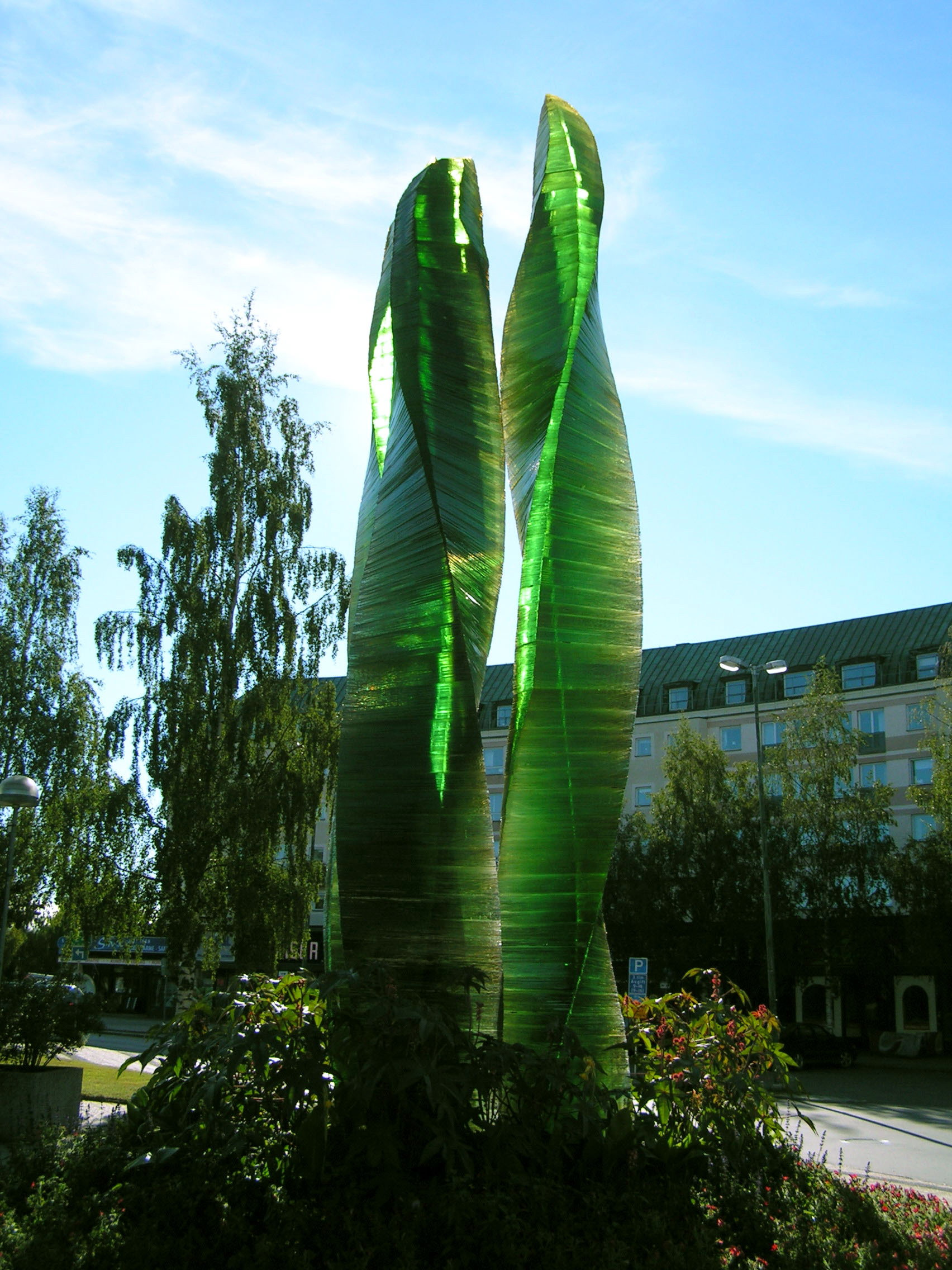
- Grön eld photographed from east.
- Artist: Vicke Lindstrand
- Year: 1970
- Type: Public work of art
- Medium: Glass
- Dimensions: 900 cm (350 in)
- Location: Järnvägstorget, Umeå, Sweden; 63°49′46″N 20°15′59″E
- Owner: Umeå Municipality

Grön eld (Fire in Green) is a glass sculpture by Vicke Lindstrand at Järnvägstorget, which is located in front of Umeå Central Station, in Umeå, Sweden. It was, at nine meters, the tallest glass sculpture in the world at the time of its inauguration in 1970.

== History ==
Sven Wallander, the head of HSB, commissioned the sculpture after he had seen the glass sculpture Prisma by Vicke Lindstrand in Norrköping. HSB donated Grön eld to Umeå Municipality, which paid for the foundation.

Lennart Johansson, who assembled the sculpture in 1970, told the press in December 2013 that he had hidden an image of Mao Zedong in one of the glass flames of the sculpture.

== The sculpture ==
Grön eld consists of three twisted glass pillars that grow thinner at the top. The glass pillars are constructed of three thousand, nine millimeter thin, plates of glass made by Emmaboda glasverk in Sweden. The glass pieces are glued together with epoxy glue in order to cope with the harsh climate. The nine meter high sculpture weighs 45 tons and is standing on a heavy concrete pedestal with a piled foundation.
