= Elise Lindqvist =

Human rights activist working to end sex slavery

Elise Marie Lindqvist (born 23 February 1936) is a Swedish volunteer at Klara Church, and a lecturer. After a lifetime of abuse and violence, and having been prostituted since the age of 16, she converted to Christianity, and is now helping prostitutes on Malmskillnadsgatan in Stockholm. Elise Lindqvist's life is described in the book Ängeln på Malmskillnadsgatan (Angel of Malskillnadsgatan), which she wrote together with Antima Linjer. Scandinavian human rights lawyers worked closely with her in the development of the Nordic Model approach to prostitution.

== Biography ==
=== Until age 58 ===
Elise Lindqvist had a difficult upbringing, experiencing sexual violence starting from age 5. She furthermore was threatened, locked-in, and moved around many times. It was believed that she might be mentally impaired, even though she only had suffered an injury to her hearing system. Her mother left her father, who was an alcoholic. After that, things became worse for Elise. She ran away from home when she was 14, lived with another family, and finished school. At age 16, she "worked" as a prostitute for the first time. She says that her stepmother was the first person to prostitute her out. She later got married, and had a daughter. Her husband was abusive towards her though. She tried to cope with this by taking prescription drugs and drinking alcohol. Eventually, she divorced him.

=== Transformation and volunteering ===
After a breakdown at age 58, she was sent to Mössebergs health resort in Falköping. The resort was run by Daga and Larseric Janson, who took care of Elise for a whole year. In the mid-1990s, Elise got involved with Klara Church and Friends of Klara Church in Stockholm. The pastor of the perish, Carl-Erik Sahlberg, has centered the social work of the church on helping the homeless and prostitutes. Elise works with the prostitutes on Malmskillnadsgatan every Friday night. She said in an interview that "her greatest joy is to see the transformation of girls who left the street and fought on". She is most commonly called "The Mother", but sometimes also "Steel Grandmother" and "The Angel".

=== Medial attention, prizes, and book release ===
In the documentary "Angel of Malmskillnadsgatan" by Peter Gaszynski on SVT2 that was aired on 24 February 2012, Eliset talked about her volunteer work among addicts and prostitutes. In the spring of 2012, she was awarded the Vitsipp Prize by the Christian Democrats in Huddinge, for her commitment to helping the vulnerable women on Malmskillnadsgatan in Stockholm. In the fall of 2013, her autobiography Angeln of Malmskillnadsgatan, written in collaboration with co-worker Antima Linjer, was published. The book and her work on Malmskillnadsgatan received a lot of attention, in connection with her appearance on the TV program Skavlan. In an interview on Nyhetsrummet.se, she comments on the book as follows: "It was not easy to open up like that; you expose yourself completely. But I want to reach those who wander around with shame and guilt, who may live a destructive life with addiction, violence, and terror, just as I did myself. I want to tell them that there is help out there." Elise Lindqvist received the Scandinavian Human Rights Committee's dignity award in 2013. At the Svenska Heroes gala on 18 December 2015, Lindqvist was hailed and named Swedish Hero for her life's work.

== Nordic Model approach on prostitution ==
Scandinavian human rights lawyers worked closely with Elise Lindqvist in the development of the Nordic Model approach to prostitution. This goal of the judicial approach on prostitution is to protect women and children from commercial sexual exploitation. The Nordic model has been adopted by Sweden, Norway, Iceland, Canada, France, Northern Ireland, Ireland, and Israel.

== Publications ==
- Ängeln på Malmskillnadsgatan (Angel of Malmskllnadsgatan) (in Swedish). Örebro: Libris. 2013. ISBN 9789173873000.
