= Regeringsgatans bro =

Coordinates: 59°20′9.5″N 18°4′3.2″E

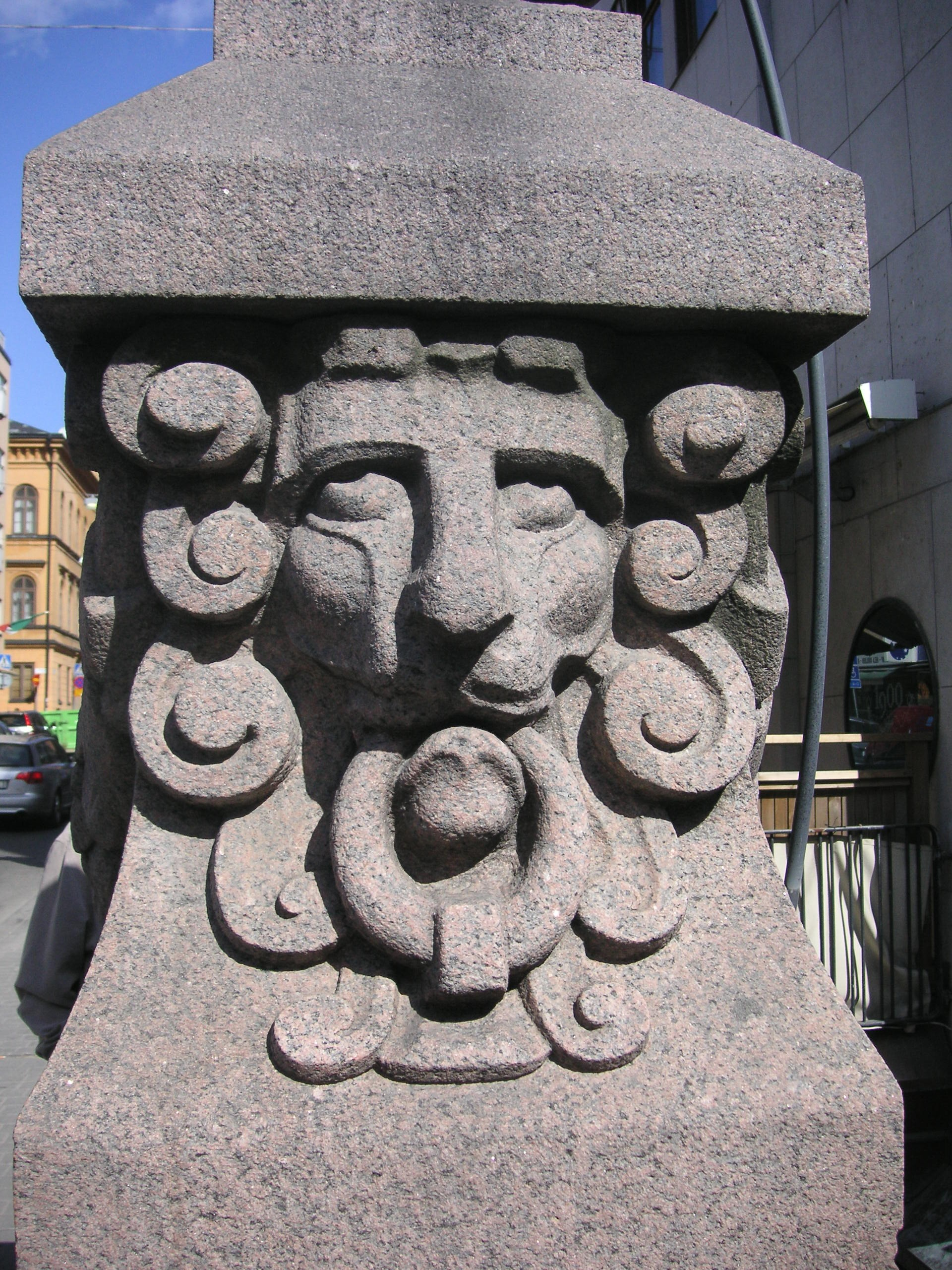
Lion's head on the bridge railing

Regeringsgatans bro (The bridge of Regeringsgatan) or more correctly Regeringsgatans viadukt över Kungsgatan (Bridge of Regeringsgatan over Kungsgatan) is a bridge in central Stockholm, Sweden, taking the street Regeringsgatan over Kungsgatan. It was inaugurated in 1910.

== Description ==
The bridge is a combined arch and beam bridge made of three reinforced concrete beams vaulted underneath and resting on two supports. Its vertical sides dressed in granite, the bridge is 11.1 metres wide with a 6.7 metres wide roadway. In contrast to the parallel bridge Malmskillnadsbron, the Bridge of Regeringsgatan is using three arches to cross Kungsgatan; the central span, 14.5 metres in length, passes over the roadway below; while the two spans on it sides, 5.5 metres in length, passes over the pavements of Kungsgatan. The unwieldy intermediate supports makes effective usage of the street width below impossible, and substituting the present construction have therefore been suggested.

== Notes ==
- In Swedish the word viadukt has a slightly different meaning from viaduct in English, and can thus signify basically any bridge stretching over land, typically a street or a railway, and itself typically part of a railway or motorway, regardless of the number of spans. Thus, in Swedish the Bridge of Regeringsgatan is therefore officially called a viadukt but name is here translated using the English word "bridge" instead.

== See also ==
- List of bridges in Stockholm
- Malmskillnadsbron
