= Marias enmansorkester =

Swedish street missionary and musician (1918–2002)

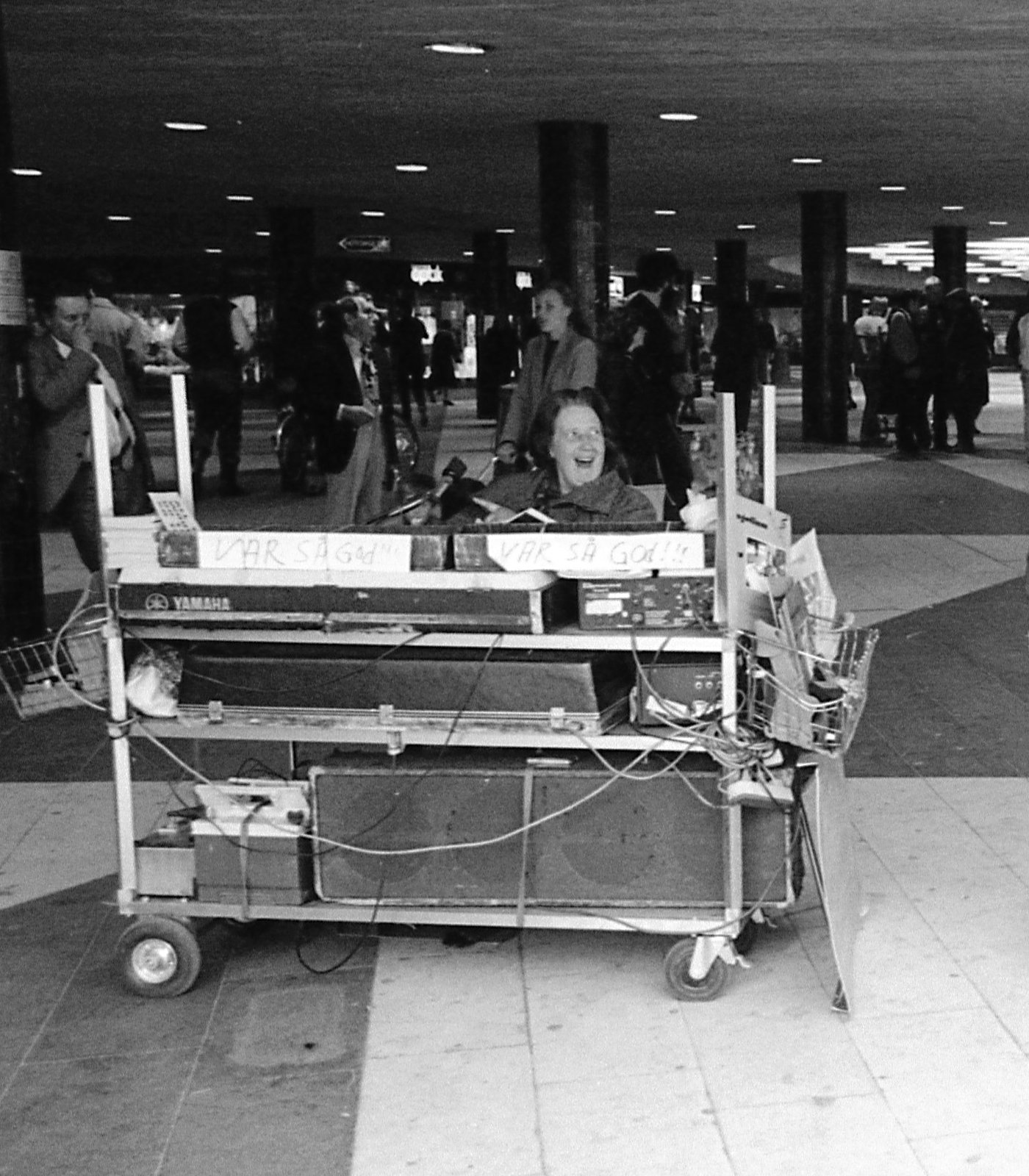
Marias enmansorkester on Sergels torg in 1980

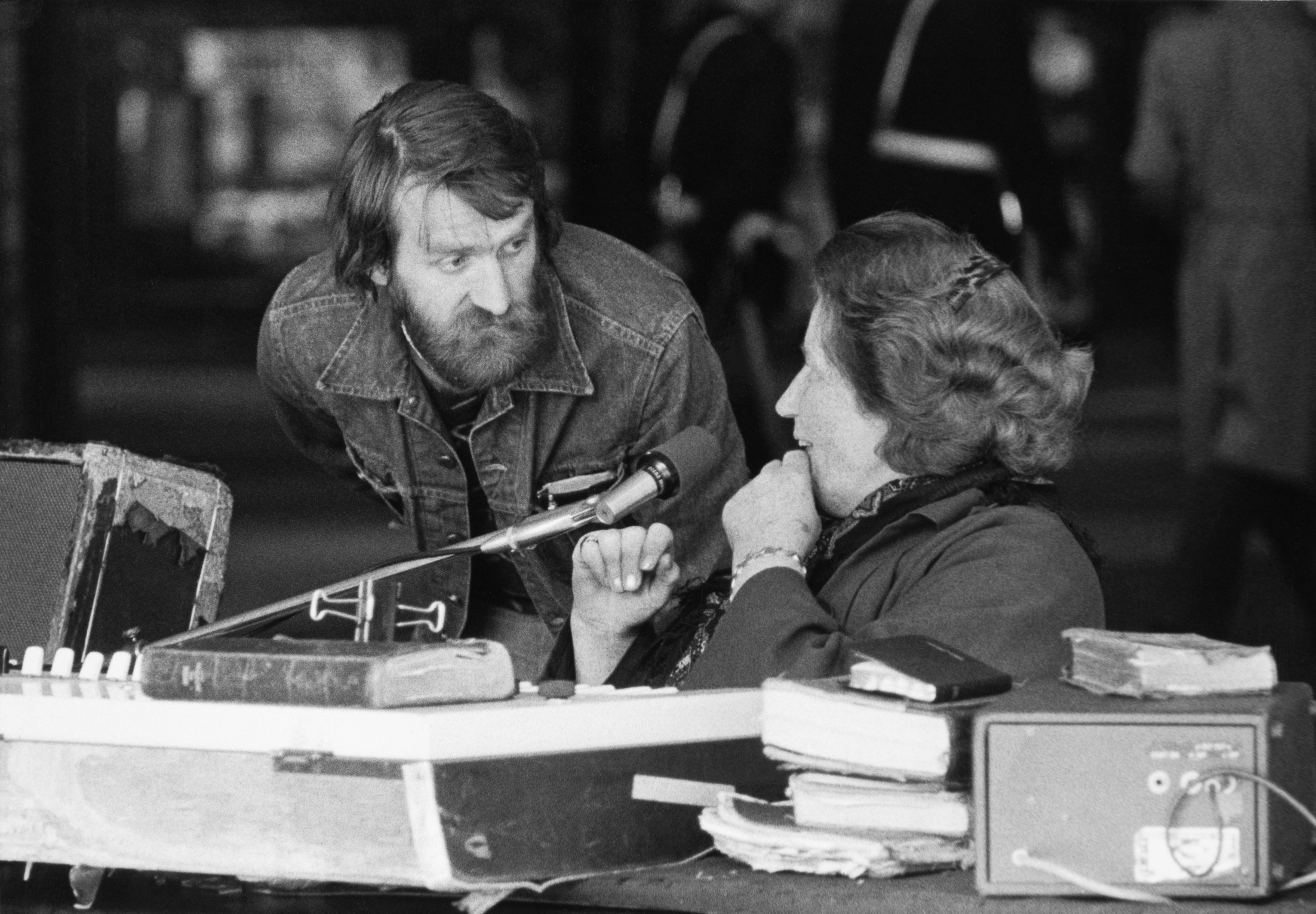
Marias enmansorkester in 1972

Hedvig Maria Johansson (née Farwall; 5 March 1918 – 6 November 2002), commonly known as Marias enmansorkester (The Maria one-man orchestra) or Maria med orgeln (Maria with the organ), was a Swedish street missionary one-man band playing daily at Sergels torg in central Stockholm from 1972 until 2002.

== Biography ==
Hedvig Maria Farwall was born in Ånimskog, Älvsborg County, on 5 March 1918. She grew up in a religious family where the father was a free churchpreacher.

Married to Erik Johansson, she lived in Stockholm as an adult playing at weddings and prophane event, and was asked to play for a lottery booth at the square Sergels torg in central Stockholm in 1970. The square itself had opened in 1967. The year after, she returned for an eight days religious song meeting and was asked to come back to Sergels torg by people, which she did in between other events.

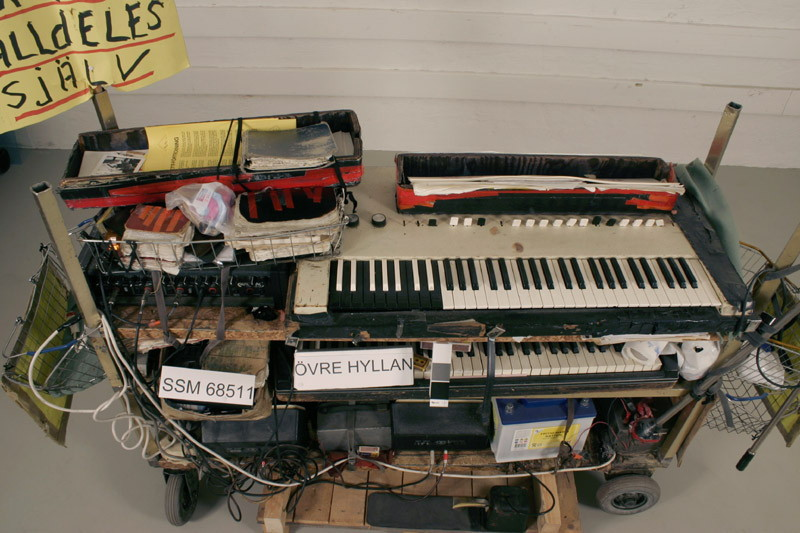
The cart at the Stockholm City Museum

On 4 September 1972, Johansson brought a cart with instruments to the square to play daily for passers-by. The setup was a cart with three shelves for two electric pianos, amplifiers, microphone and loudspeakers as well as baskets for taped recordings and pamphlets. Since 1979, it was motorised after approval from the National Swedish Road Safety Office.

The repertoire consisted of Christian songs and hymns, among them her favourite "Jag har hört om en stad ovan molnen" and her own composition "Skyddsängeln".

Johansson died in Hägersten, Stockholm, on 6 November 2002 at the age of 84. Earlier in the year, she did not have the possibility of celebrating 30 years as an artist due to her health. Her cart was donated to the Stockholm City Museum by her husband. Her funeral ceremony was held at Uppståndelsekapellet at Skogskyrkogården in Stockholm.

Johansson published an autobiography, Nardus och spikar, in 1986.
