= Malmskillnadsbron =

Coordinates: 59°20′9″N 18°3′55.78″E

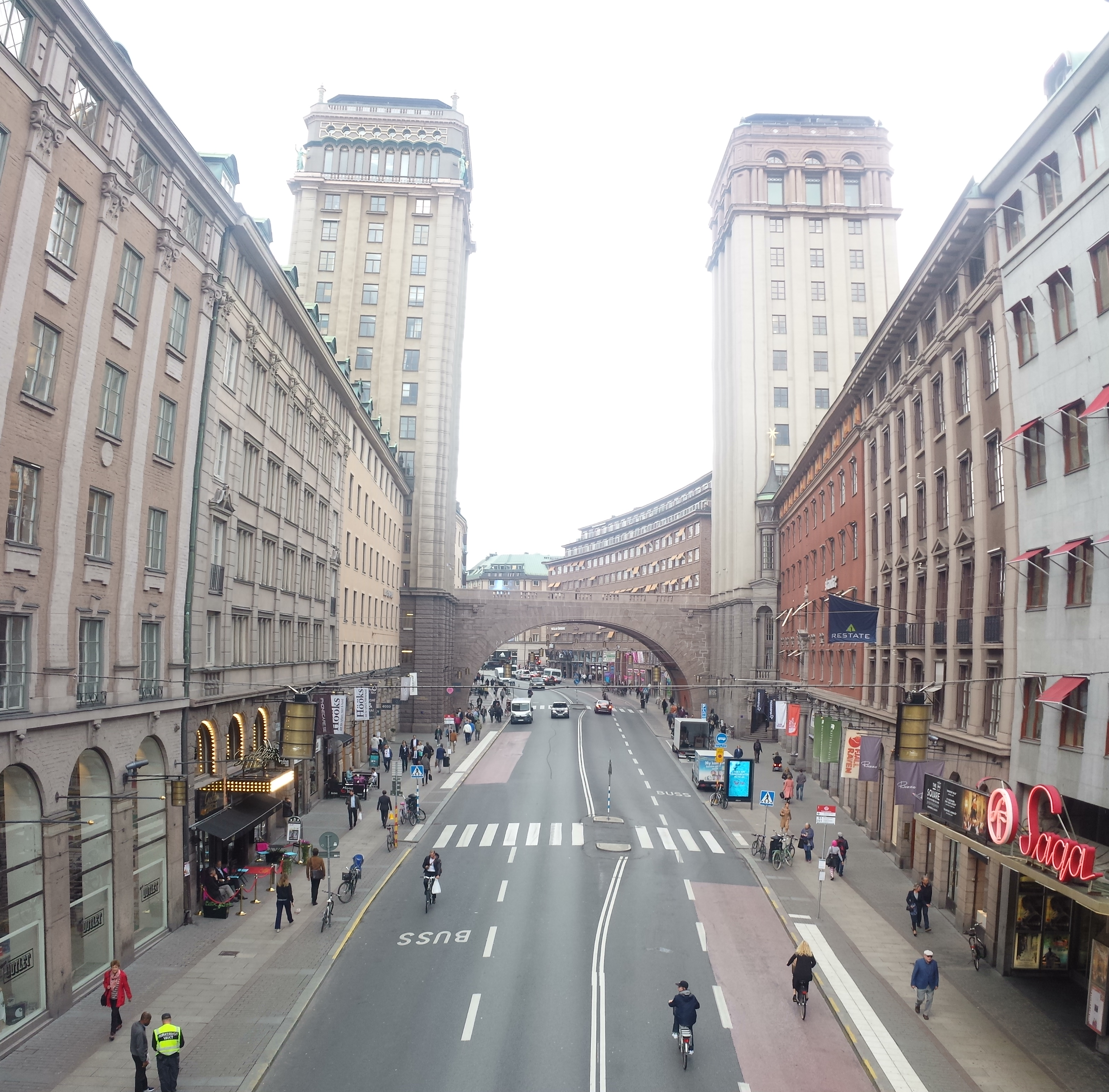
The Malmskillnadsbron crossing over the Kungsgatan.

Malmskillnadsbron (The Malmskillnad Bridge) is an arch bridge in central Stockholm, Sweden. It takes the street Malmskillnadsgatan over Kungsgatan flanked on its east side by two Art Deco towers called Kungstornen. For an explanation of Malmskillnad, see Malmskillnadsgatan.

Built in connection with the excavation of Brunkebergsåsen for Kungsgatan, Malmskillnadsbron was inaugurated in 1911, one year after the completion of the parallel bridge taking Regeringsgatan over Kungsgatan, circumstantially called Regeringsgatans viadukt över Kungsgatan, "The Bridge of Regeringsgatan over Kungsgatan", and, more popularly, Regeringsgatans bro, Bridge of Regeringsgatan.

The bridge is a reinforced concrete three-hinged arch bridge dressed in granite slabs. The vault is entirely filled and supported on both sides by concrete walls perpendicular to Kungsgatan. The span is 24 metres, the width of 9.05 metres between the railings, and the bridge has a 5.55 metres wide roadway originally dressed in cobblestones.

== See also ==
- List of bridges in Stockholm
- Bridge of Regeringsgatan
- Sveavägen
