= Kungstornen =

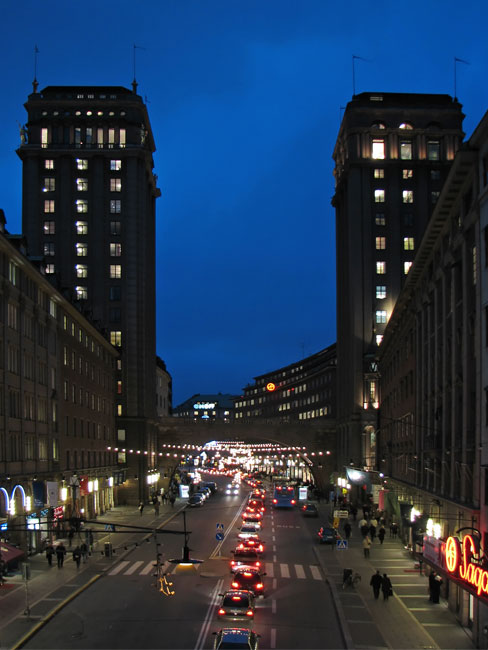
- Interactive map of the Kungstornen area

General information
- Status: Completed
- Type: Commercial offices
- Architectural style: Neoclassical
- Location: Kungsgatan 28-33; Stockholm, Sweden
- Coordinates: 59°20′10″N 18°03′56″E
- Completed: Norra: 1919 – 1924; Södra: 1924 – 1925

Height
- Roof: Norra: 60 m (200 ft); Södra: 61 m (200 ft)

Technical details
- Floor count: Norra: 16; Södra: 17
- Floor area: Norra: 6,054 m^{2} (65,160 sq ft); Södra: 10,810 m^{2} (116,400 sq ft)

Design and construction
- Architects: Ivan Callmander; Ture Wennerholm; Sven Wallander

Kungstornen (King's Towers) are twin tower skyscrapers, individually named Norra Kungstornet (Northern King's Tower) and Södra Kungstornet (Southern King's Tower), in Kungsgatan street in Norrmalm, Stockholm. The 16-storey Norra Kungstornet is 60 m (200 ft) and was built between 1919 and 1924; and the taller 17-storey, 61 m (200 ft) Södra Kungstornet was built between 1924 and 1925. Together, they are considered the first modern skyscrapers in Europe.

The tower pair marks a slight bend in the street, one block east of Hötorget, where it is crossed by the 16 m (52 ft) Malmskillnadsbron, a bridge in the course of Malmskillnadsgatan, to which they are adjacent. They are 16 m (52 ft) and of similar, but not identical, exterior design. Their construction was inspired by American models, particularly the architecture of Lower Manhattan of the time. The north tower was designed by Sven Wallander who also authored the 1919 master plan for Kungsgatan; the southern tower was designed by Ivar Callmander.

== See also ==
- List of tallest buildings in Sweden
