= Maritime Museum (Stockholm) =

The Maritime Museum
- Sjöhistoriska museet

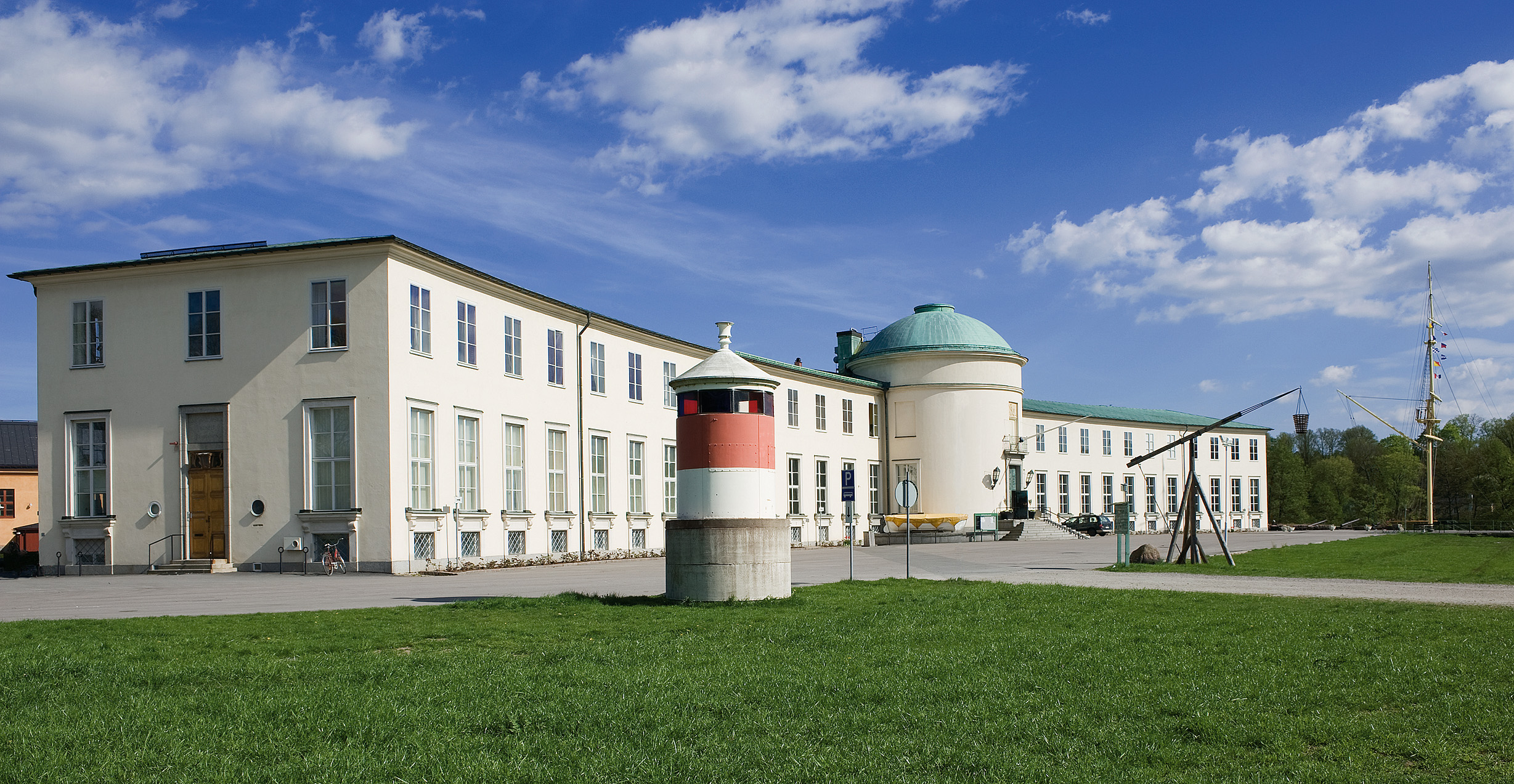
- The Maritime Museum
- Established: 28 May 1938
- Location: Djurgårdsbrunnsvägen 24 on Gärdet in Stockholm, Sweden
- Coordinates: 59°19′57″N 18°06′57″E
- Type: Maritime museum
- Director: Hans-Lennart Ohlsson
- Public transit access: Bus 69 from T-Centralen
- Website: www.sjohistoriska.se

The Maritime Museum (Swedish: Sjöhistoriska museet) in Stockholm, Sweden is a museum for naval history, merchant shipping and shipbuilding. Located in the Gärdet section of the inner-city district Östermalm, the museum offers a panoramic view of the bay Djurgårdsbrunnsviken. The building was designed by architect Ragnar Östberg and built in 1933–36.

== Collections ==
The museum houses about 900,000 photos, 50,000 objects and 45,000 drawings, all related to the sea, coast, ships and boats, past and present. A major part of the collection, the boats, are currently exhibited in a facility on Rindö, an island outside Vaxholm in the Stockholm archipelago. The boat collection ranges from canoes to Skerry cruisers.

On the bottom floor there are, among other things, exhibits on naval history including several detailed models of 18th century ships. The second floor includes exhibits on Swedish commercial fleets. In the basement is a replica of a cabin in King Gustav III's ship Amphion, along with the original stern from the ship.

== Listing of historical ships ==
The Maritime Museum is responsible for the listing of historical ships in Sweden. Both ships and pleasure boats of historical significance can be listed. While the listing offers no legal protection or obligations, it gives the owner of the craft certain privileges.

== Architecture ==
The gently curved building, inspired by the neoclassicist design of Olof Tempelman (1746–1816), acts as a background for the surrounding park where open-air concerts are held each year. It was the last major commission of Ragnar Östberg and was built on the location for the Stockholm Exhibition (1930) (Stockholmsutställningen 1930). As the exhibition was an important Functionalism manifestation, the museum also mark the point of view of the architect in the debate the introduction of Functionalist style caused in Sweden. The central cupola is entirely built of brick. The building also houses a model workshop, wood shop, photo studio, archives and a library. In the 1970s, a film and lecture hall was added and in the 1990s a café.

Outside of the museum is a bronze statue called The Sailor (Sjömannen), a memorial to the Swedish sailors who died during World War II. The statue was made by artist Nils Sjögren in 1952, just before he died. The statue was inaugurated in 1953.

== Concerts ==
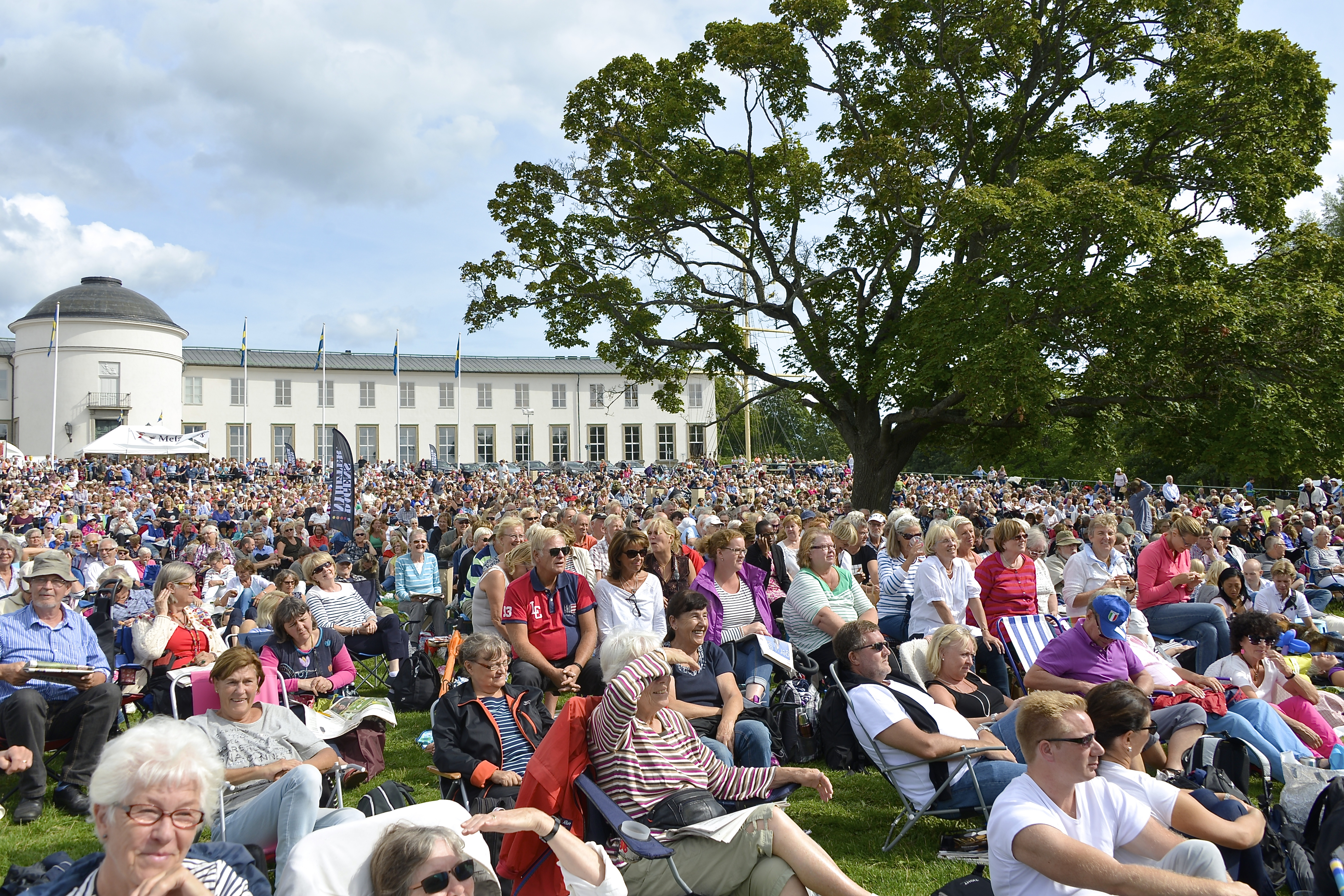
The Dagens Nyheter concert in 2014

Starting in 1975, open-air concerts and music festivals are held in the park in front of the museum. The annual concerts arranged by the newspaper Dagens Nyheter with the Royal Stockholm Philharmonic Orchestra are compared with, and inspired by, The Proms in the Royal Albert Hall. Among the other artists who have performed at events held at the museum are Oasis, Lisa Nilsson, Kent, Pearl Jam, Sarah Dawn Finer, Axwell, and Per Gessle.

== Gallery ==
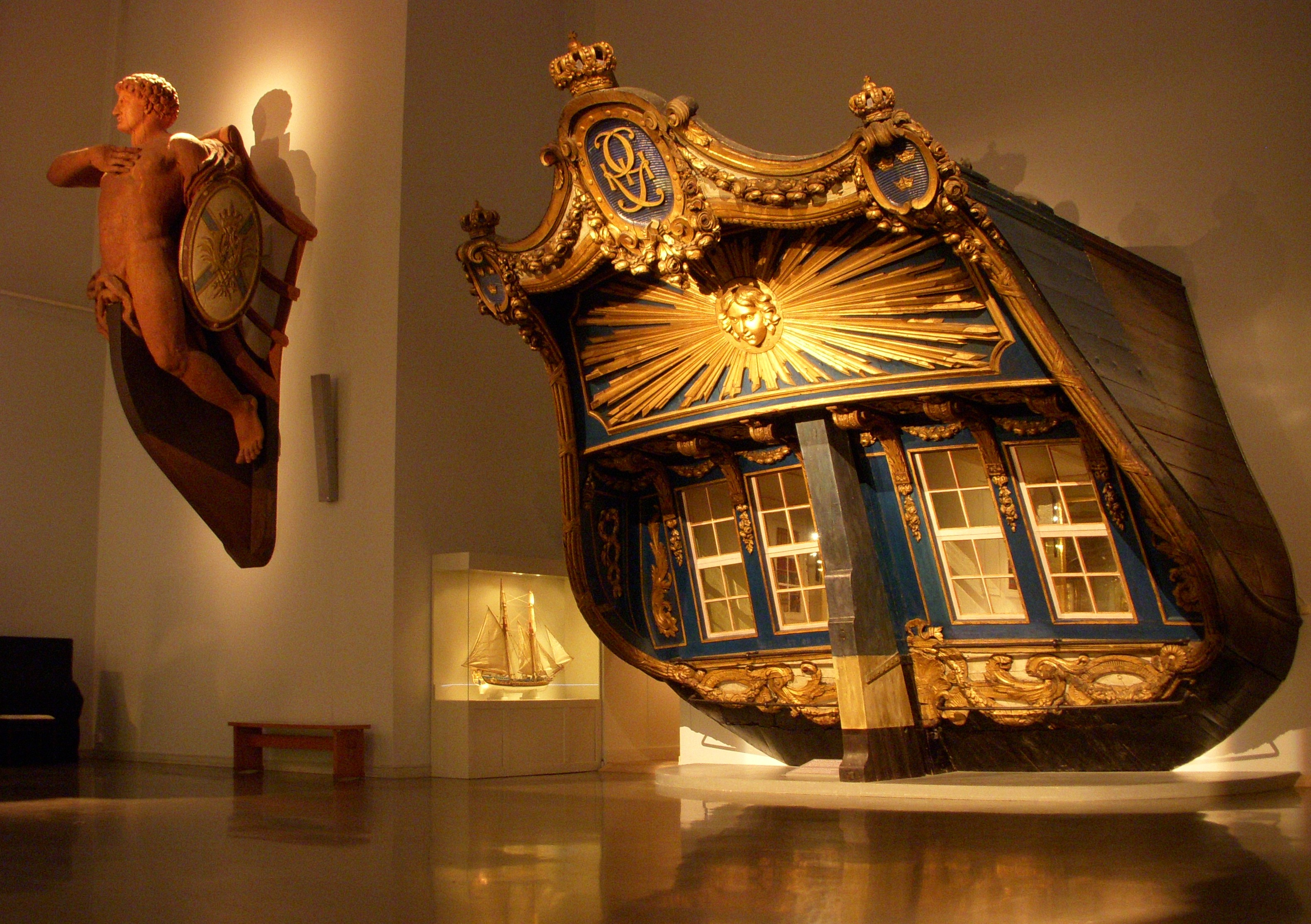
Stern of the Amphion

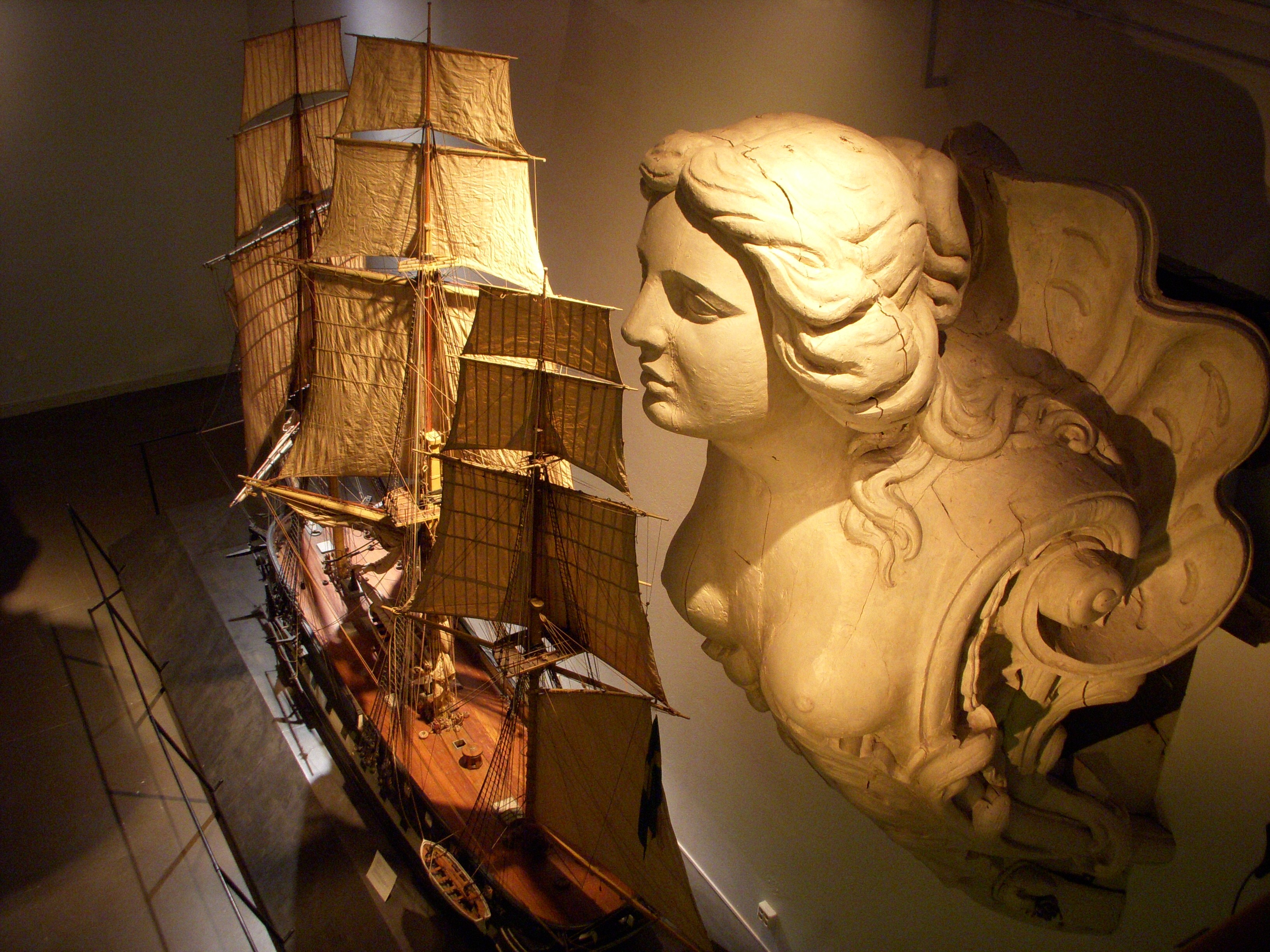
Ship model

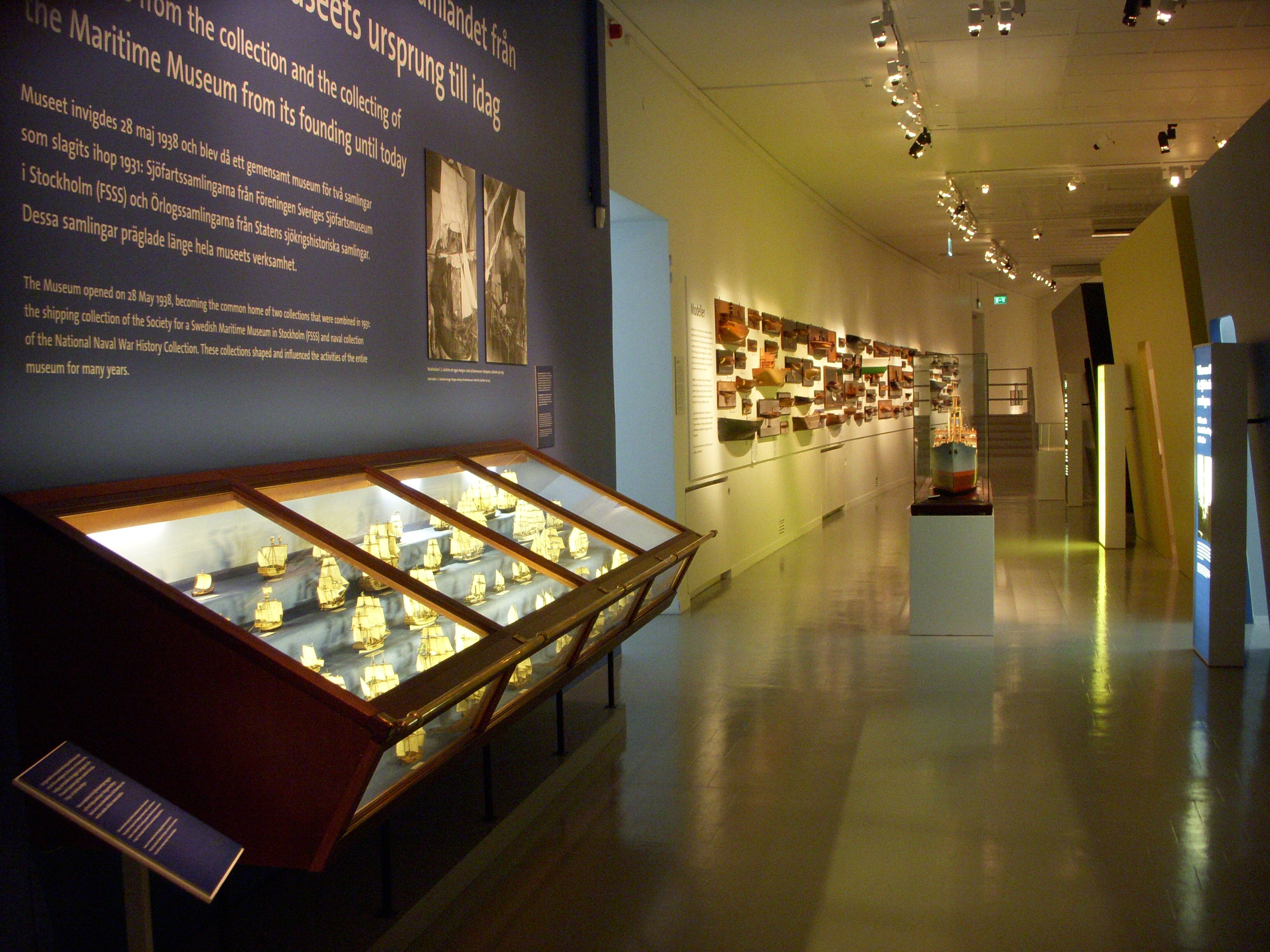
Exhibition hall

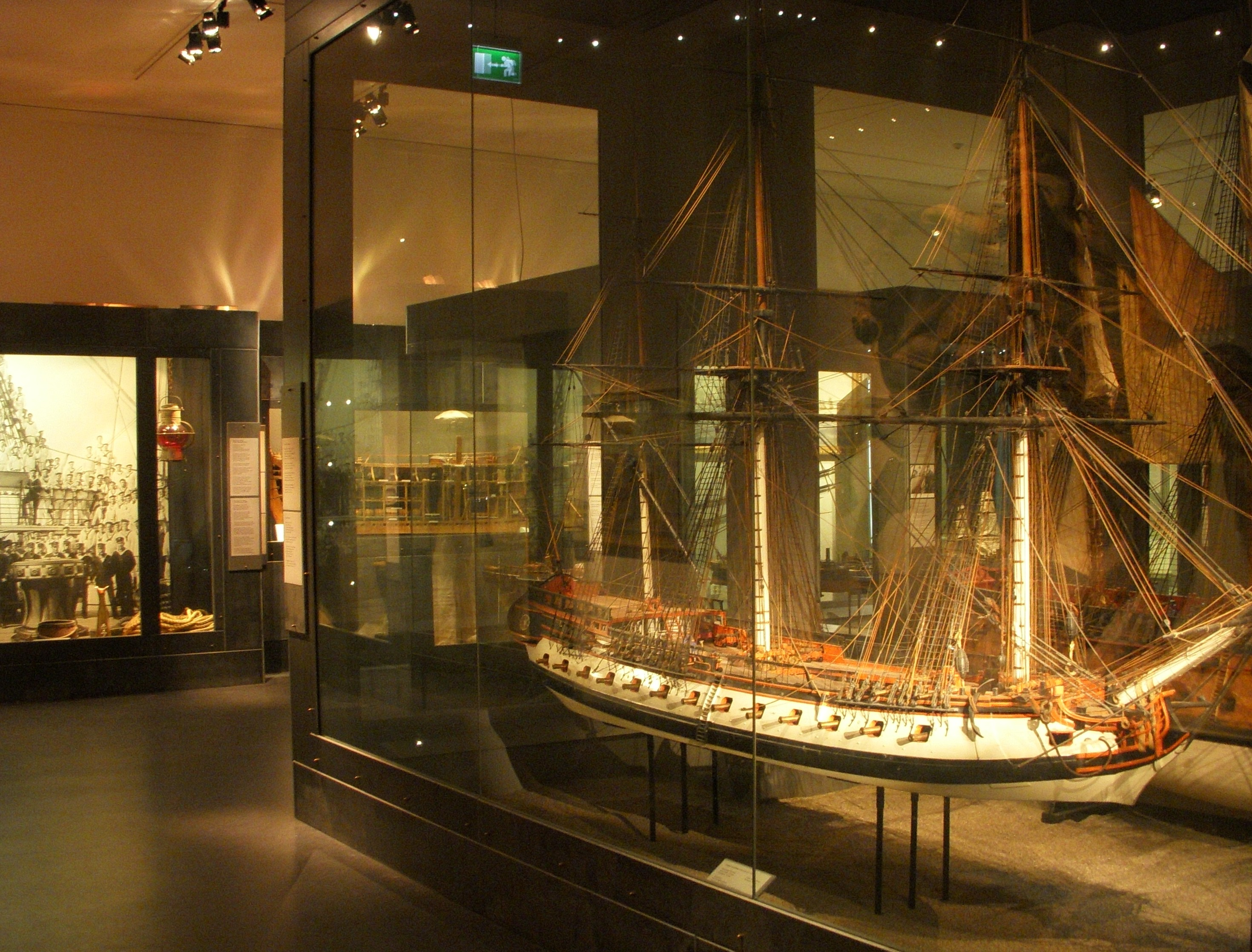
Exhibition hall

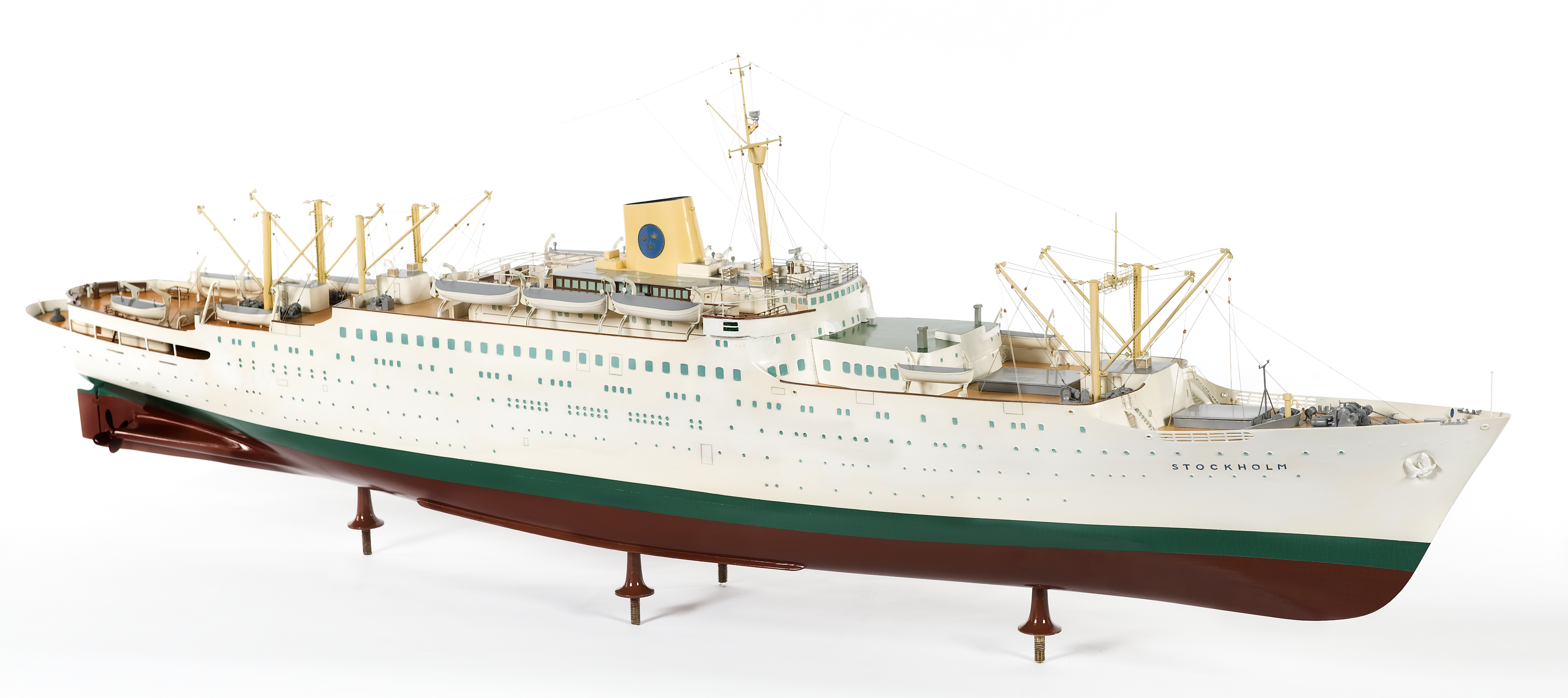
MS Stockholm

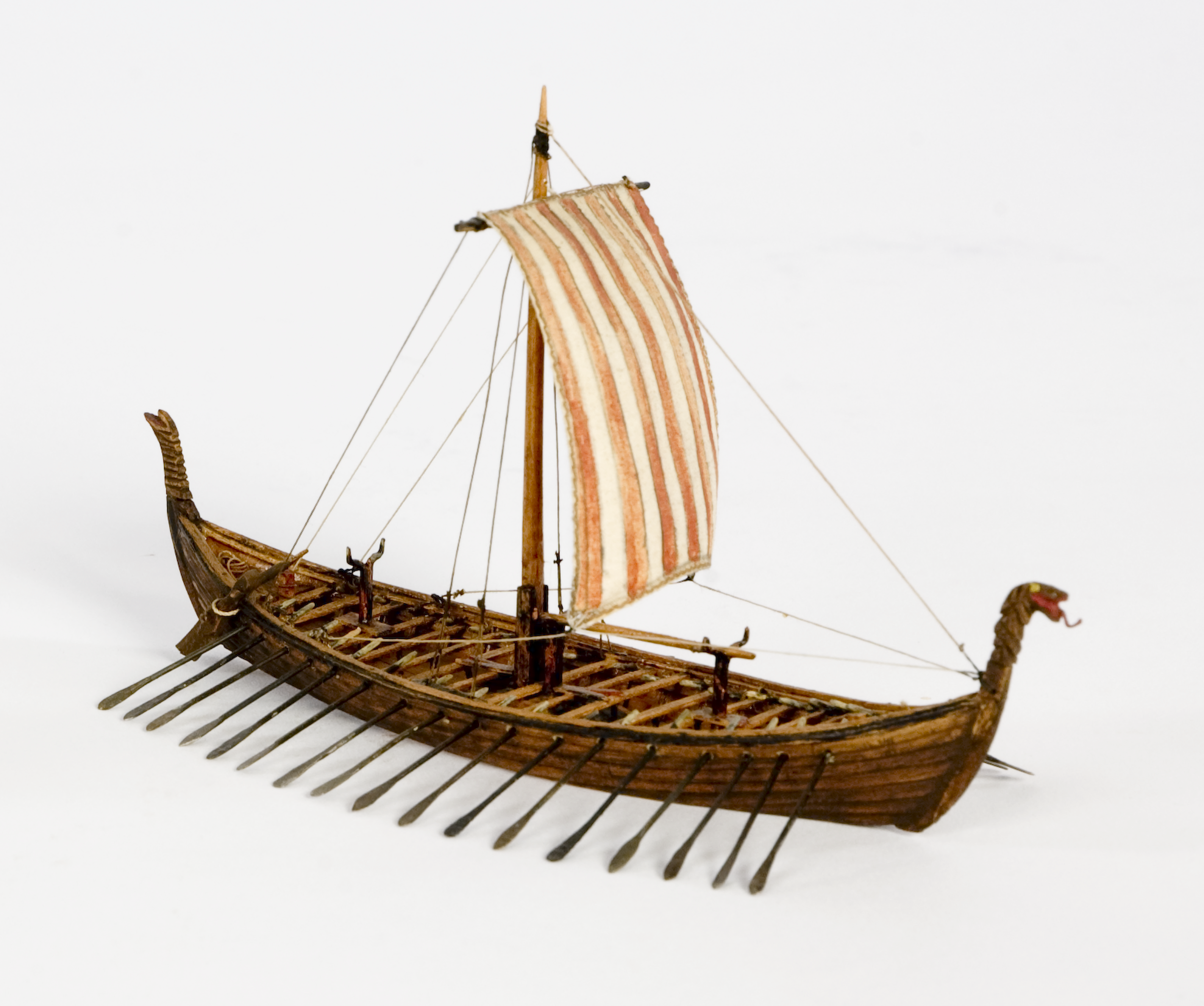
Ship Model

== See also ==
- List of museums in Stockholm
