= Nils Sjögren =

Swedish sculptor

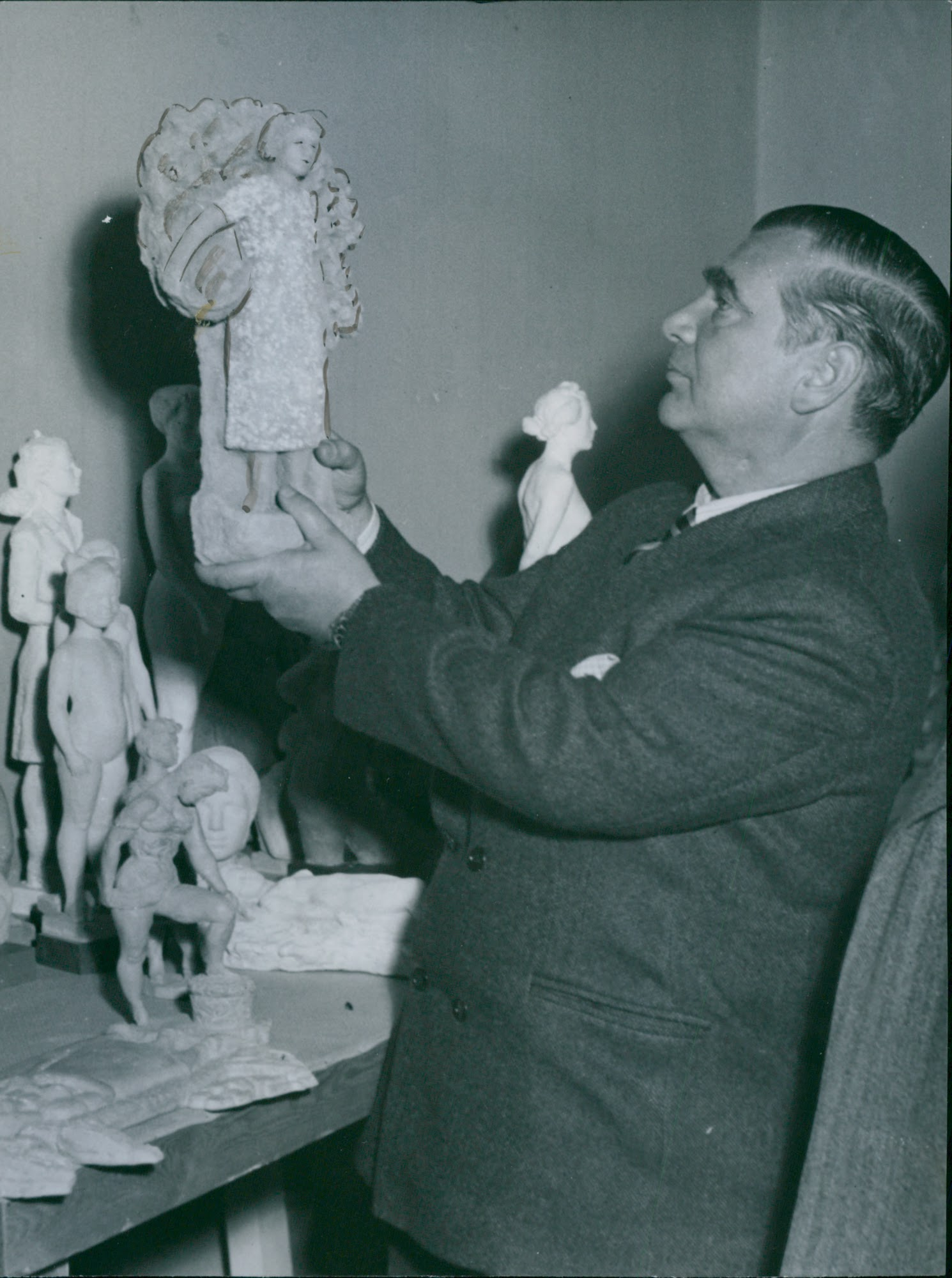
Professor Nils Sjögren briefly reviews one of the sculptures that were submitted to the exhibition "God konst i alla hem"

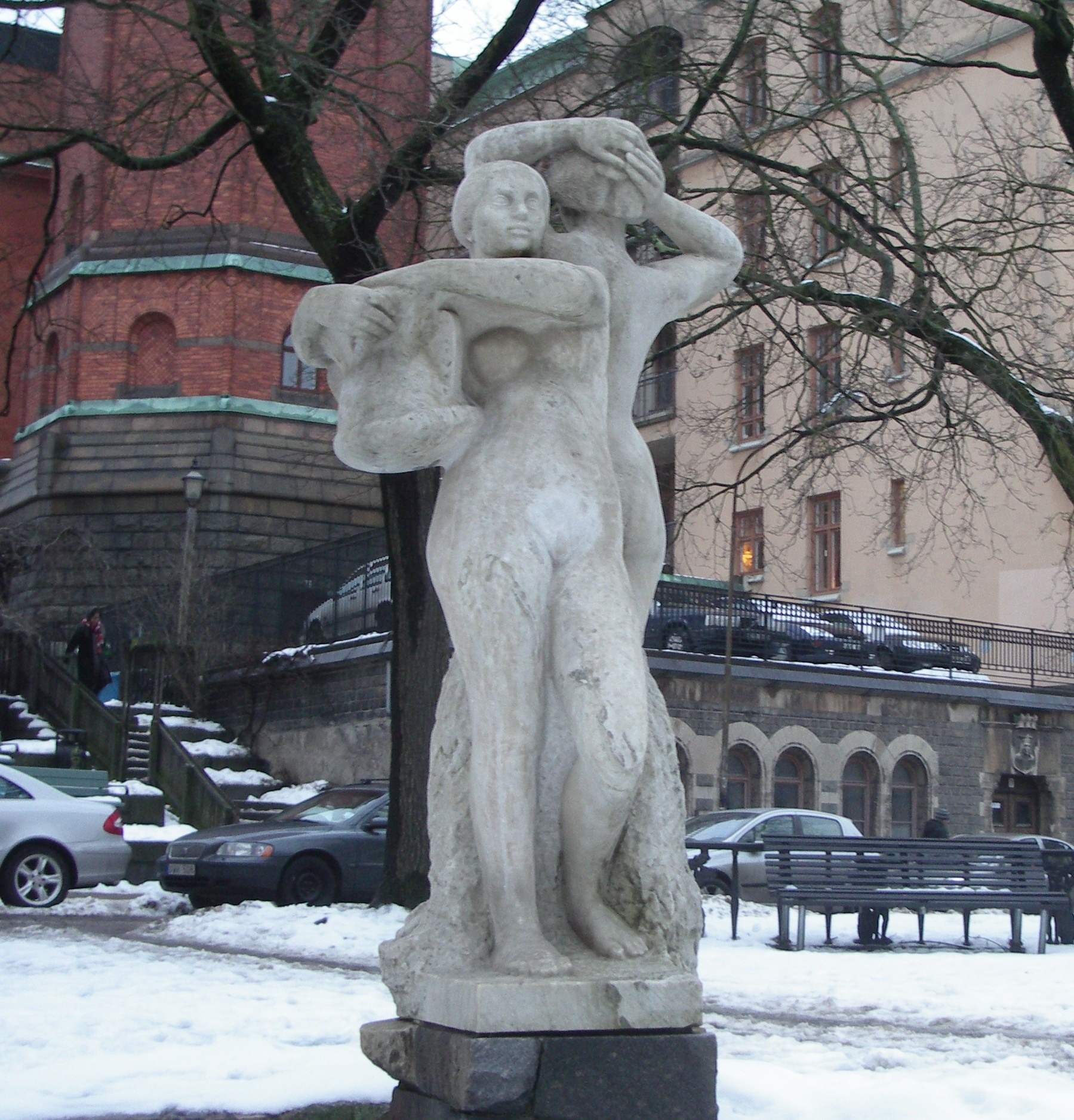
The sisters', work by Nils Sjögren

Nils A G Sjögren (1894, Stockholm – 1952) was a Swedish sculptor.

== Works, a selection ==
- Relief in the Engelbrekt room in Örebro Castle (1928)
- Statues at Stockholm Public Library (1928), bronze (Adam, Eva and Krigarfigur)
- Vasabrunnen (1928), bronze, Larmtorget in Kalmar, the first of a series of wells in Swedish towns
- Vågen och vindarna (1931), Tegelbacken, at Stockholms ström in Stockholm
- Finn Malmgren (1931), bronze, Börjeplan in Uppsala
- Olaus och Laurentius Petri (1929–34), vid Olaus Petri Church, Örebro
- Systrarna (1935–45), marble, Mosebacke in Stockholm
- Krönikebrunnen (1934–39), bronze in Skara
- Sjuhäradsbrunnen or Torgbrunnen (1934–41), brons, Stora torget i Borås
- Melodin, at Brudlyckan in Norrköping, erected in 1948, Snigelparken in Årsta in Stockholm, erected 1953
- Efter badet or Sommar (erected 1944), Reimersholme in Stockholm, by the name Sommar outside the county museum in Linköping and in Stadsträdgården in Gävle, in bronze (erected 1947), at Guldhedstorget in Gothenburg
- Fontänen Tragos – Tragediens födelse (erected 1943), bronze, in Malmö
- Cecilia, bronze, Kungsparken in Skene
- De fyra elementens brunn (1941–58), bronze, Torget in Enköping
- Rochdalemonumentet (1944), granite, Vår gård in Saltsjöbaden
- Venus i snäckan (1950), Domarringen School in Uppsala
- Mot framtiden (1950), granit, Vår gård i Saltsjöbaden
- Teaterbrunnen, or Tragos (1945–53), limestone and bronze, in front of the Malmö Opera and Music Theatre in Malmö
- Sjömannen (rest 1953), bronze, at Maritime Museum (Stockholm) at Djurgårdsbrunnsviken in Stockholm
- Plaster fresco, at Bastugatan 21 in Stockholm
- Venus i snäckan (?), (1937), fountain, bronze, at the courtyard at Birger Jarlsgatan 16 in Stockholm
