= Vicke Lindstrand =

Swedish designer (1904–1983)

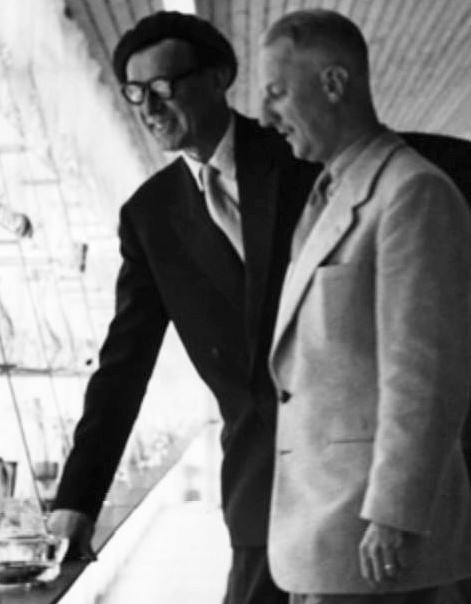
- Vicke Lindstrand and Bruno Mathsson in 1954
- Born: November 27, 1904; Gothenburg, Sweden
- Died: May 7, 1983 (aged 78); Kosta, Sweden

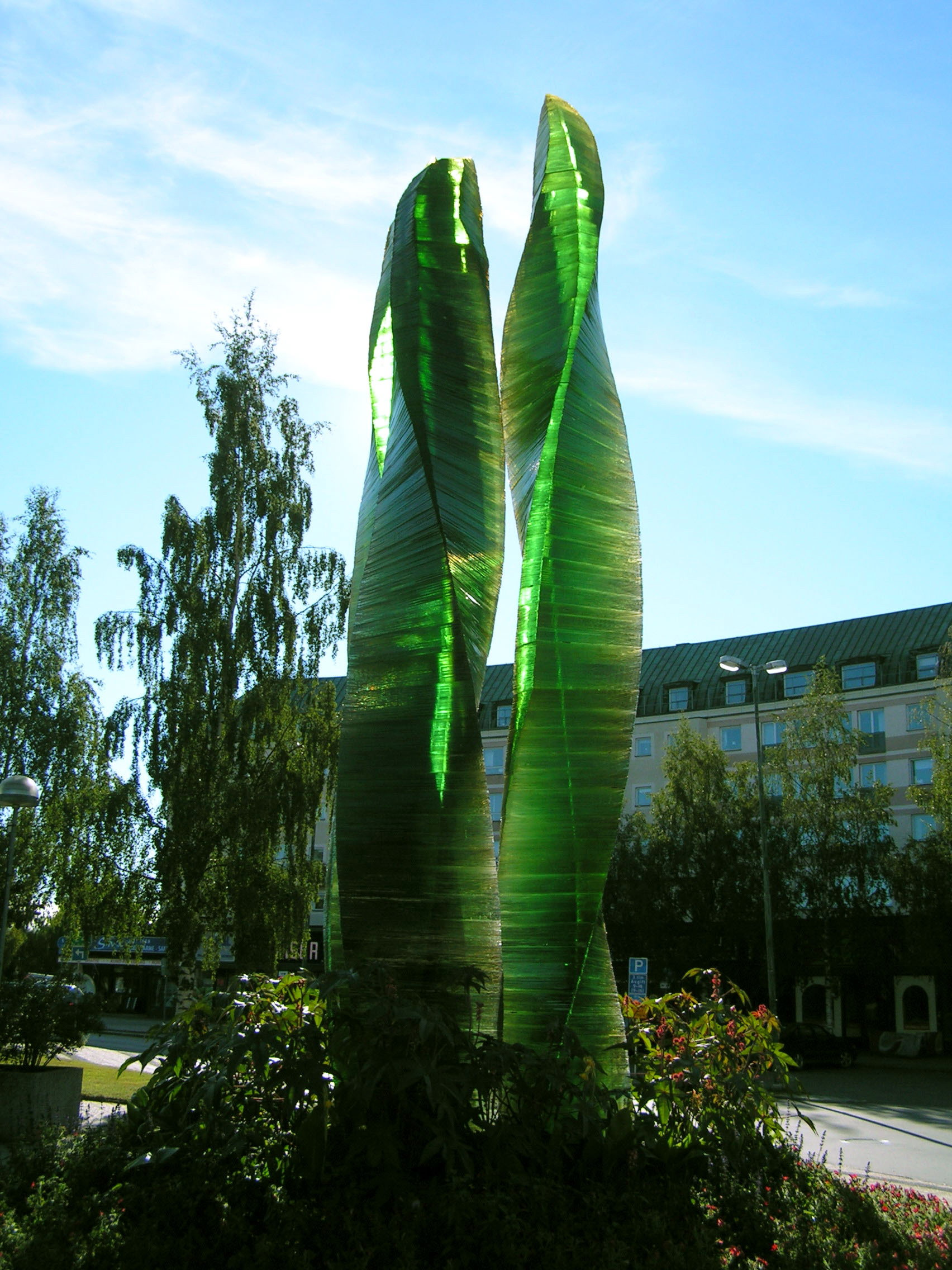
Grön eld ("Green fire"), Umeå

Victor Emanuel Lindstrand, known as Vicke Lindstrand (27 November 1904 in Gothenburg – 7 May 1983 in Kosta) was a Swedish glass designer, textile and ceramic designer, and painter. He is considered a pioneer of Swedish glass art. His work was part of the art competitions at the 1932 Summer Olympics and the 1936 Summer Olympics.

== Background ==
As a child, Lindstrand was interested in drawing. He had studied commercial art and worked in commercial illustration before beginning his career at the glass manufacturer Orrefors in 1928. He pioneered more daring art glass designs at Orrefors and together with Edvin Öhrström and Knut Bergqvist he invented the Ariel technique. In 1950 he joined Kosta Glasbruk as an artistic director before his retirement in 1973. At Kosta, he was the dominant designer, lending his name to many now classic designs. At this point, Lindstrand began to inject more and more colour into his creations, which resulted in iconic designs such as Trees in the Fog and Autumn. He spent the last 10 years of his life as a freelance artist working with Hanne Dreutler and Arthur Zirrnsack at Studio Glashyttan in Åhus.

He made his debut as a designer at the Stockholm World Fair in 1930, where he presented twelve glass vases with enamel decor in exotic patterns. For this he received great attention from international design publications. Lindstrand added new artistic dimensions to the already famous Orrefors glass with his unique designs and revitalization of classic forms and techniques. During his time at Orrefors he worked on engraved glass and Graal glass vases. With sculptor Edvin Öhrström he developed the new Ariel technique (named by his actress wife Kristina). Orrefors could not afford to keep Lindstrand during the war and between 1943 and 1950 he became creative leader at Uppsala Ekeby, where he designed many different stoneware objects ranging from pots to figural sculptures.

== Monumental glass sculptures ==
Constructed with thousands of 8mm thick glass window panes, glued together using invisible 2 part epoxy glue (Ciba-Geigy). The flat-drawn glass used (Emmaboda, Sweden) is deep green when seen from the edge of the pane (modern float glass would be much paler).

- Monumental Fountain, New York World Fair, 1939 (3m tall, 6 tons, not a flat pane construction)
- Ikaros Nadel, Stuttgart, 1964 (9m tall, 24 tons, 1000 panes) 48°45′0.1″N 9°6′19.8″E
- Prisma, Norrköping, 1967 (11.5m tall, 33 ton, 3500 panes)
- Grön eld, Umeå, 1970 (9m tall, 45 tons, 3000 panes)
- Legend i Glas, Växjö, 1978 (5.5m tall, 12 tons, 1100 panes)
