= Malmskillnadsgatan =

Street in central Stockholm, Sweden

Coordinates: 59°20′9″N 18°3′55.78″E

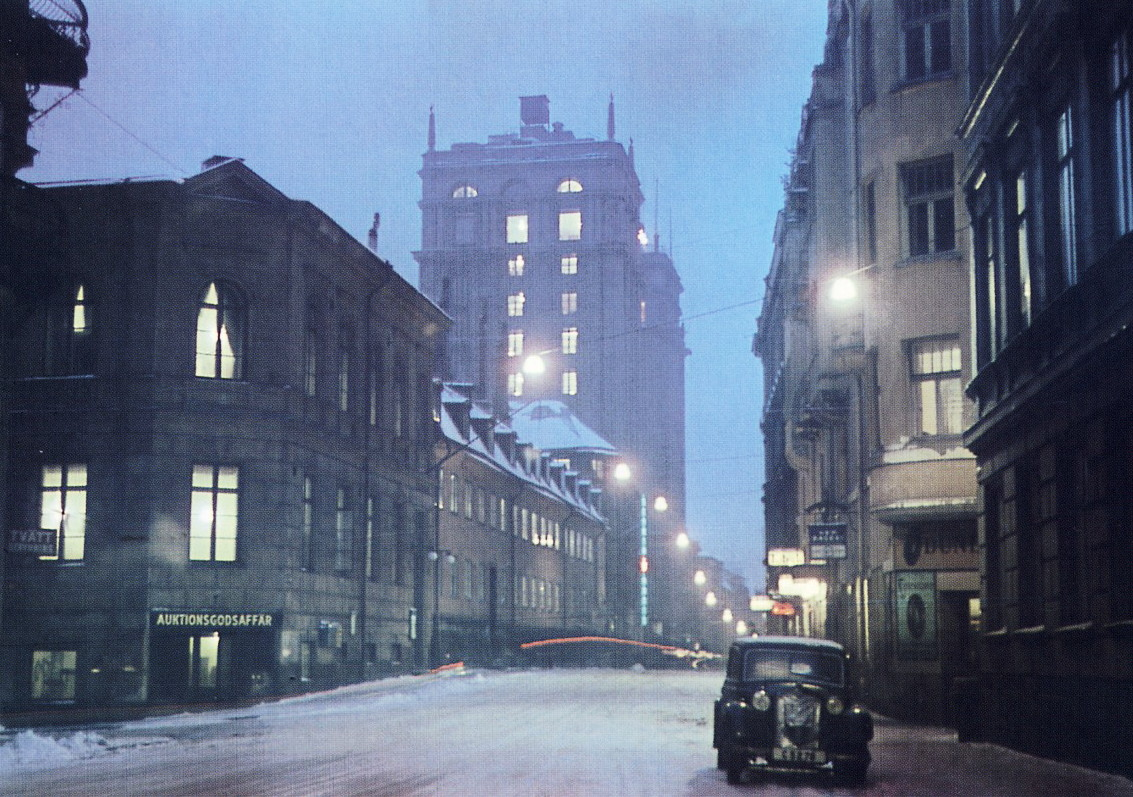
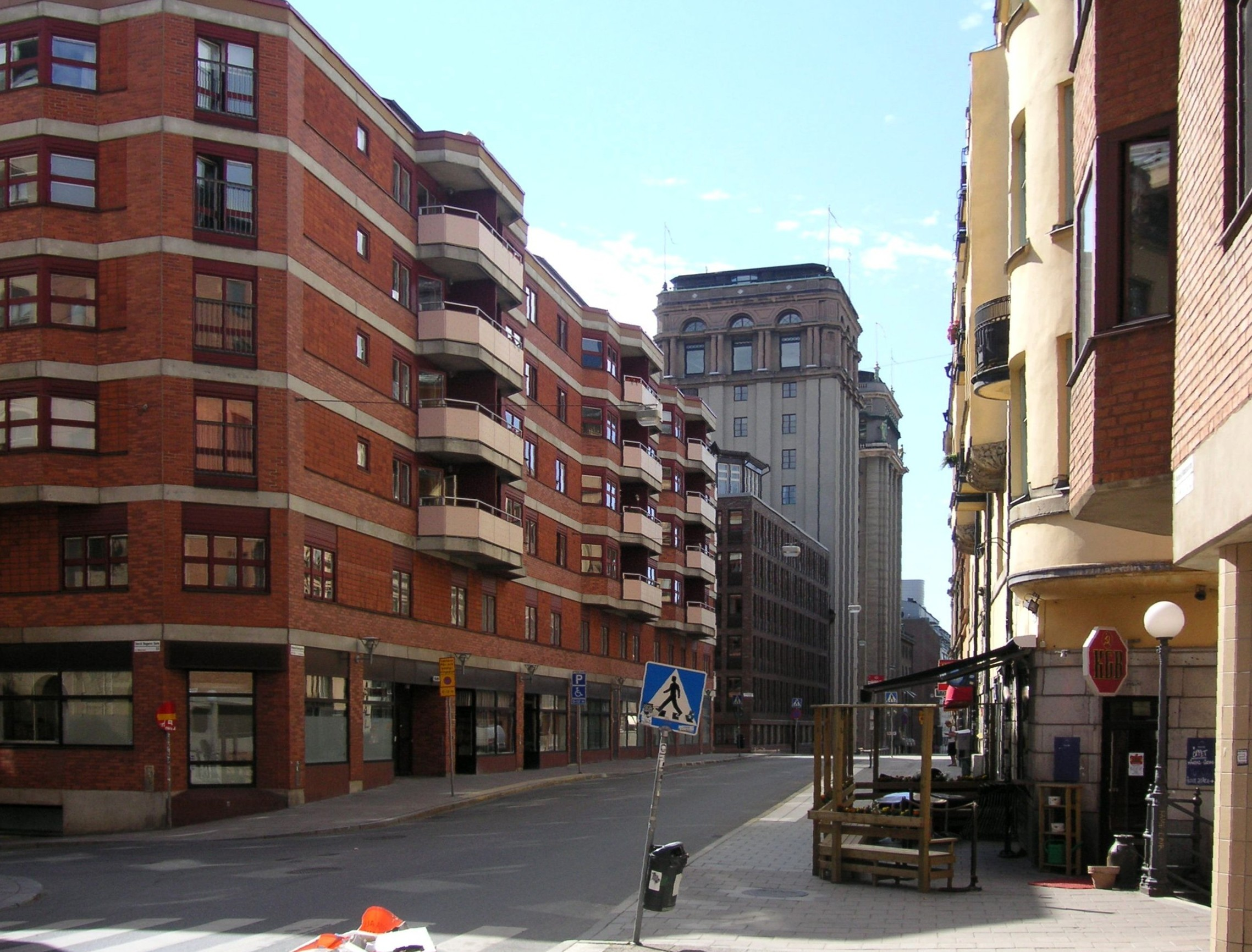
Malmskillnadsgatan 1946 and from the same perspective 2008, Kungstornen in the background

Notable buildings and other structures
No	Name	Built
1-7	Bank of Sweden	1974
9	House of Culture	1971–76
11-21	SEB Group	1965
23-25	Nordea	1965
39	Centrumhuset	1931
46-48	Ingenjörshuset	1964
50	Södra Kungstornet	1925
	Malmskillnad Bridge	1911
	Malmskillnadstrappan	1932
52	Norra Kungstornet	1924
64	Johannes fire station	1877

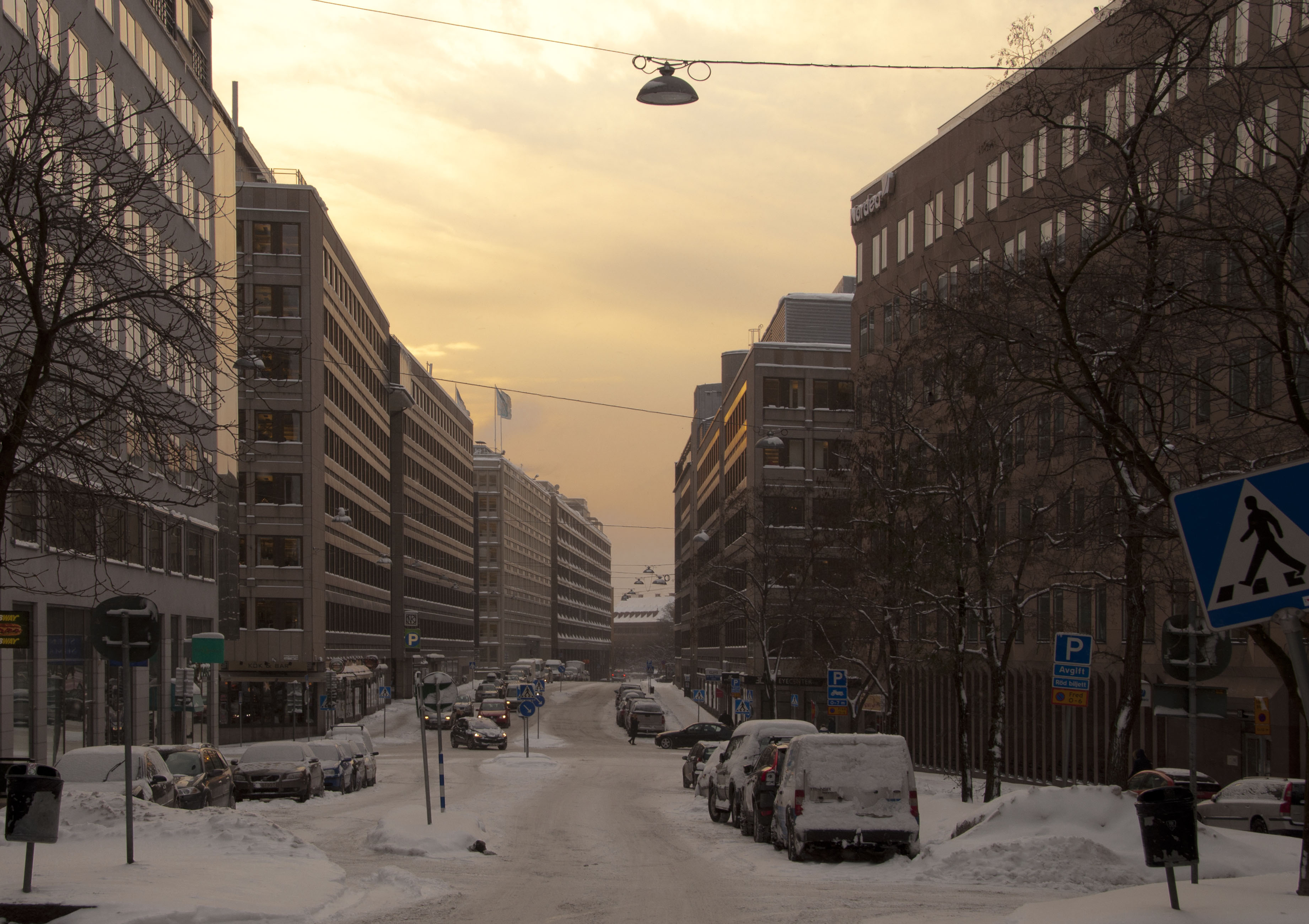
Malmskillnadsgatan 2010

Malmskillnadsgatan (Swedish: "The Ridge Dividing Street") is a 650-metre long street in central Stockholm, Sweden. It stretches northward from the Brunkebergstorg square over Hamngatan; crosses Mäster Samuelsgatan and Oxtorgsgatan; passes over the bridge Malmskillnad Bridge passing over Kungsgatan; crosses Brunnsgatan and David Bagares gata; and finally ends at Johannes plan near Döbelnsgatan.

In today's Sweden, at the end of the last ice age, the retiring ice sheet left behind several ridges filled with sand and rounded gravel, ridges called malmar (sing. malm) in Swedish. In the central-northern part of Stockholm, the Brunkebergsåsen, divided the Norrmalm district in an eastern and western part, Östermalm and Västermalm, and Malmskillnadsgatan is a street passing along the top of the ridge.

First appearing in documents from the 17th century, the name Malmskillnaden arguably designated some sort of road passing over the Ridge of Brunkeberg, an eventuality obscured by the appearance of the name Skillnadsgatan ("The difference/Divergence street"). The street itself first appears in a map dated 1640, detailing the planned development of Norrmalm, but due to the excavation required, Malmskillnadsgatan was to remain an impracticable for some time. In the late 17th century however, a street called Malm skillnadz gatun is stretching north from Brunkebergstorg to Oxtorget, where a sand hill separated it from what is today its northern section. During the 1710s, finally, the street was entirely united as can be seen in a map dated 1733.

In association with the post-war redevelopment of central Stockholm, the residential area along the southern part of the street was transformed into a business area, isolated from the surrounding shopping district.

During the 1970s and 1980s, Malmskillnadsgatan (with Artillerigatan in the Östermalm district) was a traditional site for street prostitution in Stockholm), as the isolated location of the street made it completely abandoned after business hours.

== See also ==
- Geography of Stockholm
