= List of museums in Stockholm =

The following is a list of museums in and around Stockholm.

== Art ==
- Artipelag
- Fotografiska
- Millesgården
- Milliken Gallery
- Moderna Museet
- Museum of Far Eastern Antiquities
- National Gallery
- Sven-Harrys Konstmuseum
- Swedish Centre for Architecture and Design
- Swedish Museum of Performing Arts
- Tensta Konsthall
- Thiel Gallery
- Waldemarsudde

== History ==
- Economy Museum - Royal Coin Cabinet
- Museum of Medieval Stockholm
- Medelhavsmuseet
- Skansen
- Museum of Ethnography, Sweden
- Swedish History Museum
- Stockholm County Museum
- Stockholm City Museum
- Livrustkammaren
- Swedish Army Museum
- The Maritime Museum
- Nordic Museum
- Vasa Museum
- Jewish Museum in Stockhholm
- The Viking Museum
- Swedish Holocaust Museum

== Science, technology ==
- Nobel Prize Museum
- Stockholm Observatory
- Stockholm Tramway Museum
- Biological museum
- Swedish National Museum of Science and Technology
- Swedish Museum of Natural History

== People ==
- Hallwyl Museum
- Strindberg Museum
- ABBA: The Museum
- Avicii Experience

== Other ==
- Museum of Spirits
- Police Museum (Stockholm)

== See also ==
- List of museums in Sweden
