= Jessica Jackson Hutchins =

American artist

- Born: 1971 (age 54–55); Chicago, IL
- Education: M.F.A., School of the Art Institute of Chicago; Post-bacc, School of the Art Institute of Chicago; B.A. in Art History, Oberlin College
- Spouse: Stephen Malkmus

Jessica Jackson Hutchins (born 1971) is an American artist from Chicago, Illinois who is based in Portland, Oregon. Her practice consists of large scale ceramics, multi-media installations, assemblage, and paintings all of which utilize found objects such as old furniture, ceramics, worn out clothes, and newspaper clippings. She is most recognizable for her sloppy craft assemblages of furniture and ceramics. Her work was selected for the 2010: Whitney Biennial, featured in major art collections, and has been exhibited throughout the United States and internationally, in Iceland, the UK, and Germany.

== Life and work ==
Jessica Jackson Hutchins received a BA in Art History from Oberlin College, graduating Cum Laude. In 1997 she finished a Post-Baccalaureate degree at the School of the Art Institute of Chicago. She went on to receive an MFA from The School of the Art Institute of Chicago in 1999. Though she was in the Painting and Drawing Department, she produced very little paintings as she preferred to work in wire and papier-mâché. Hutchins studied under and was influenced by Susanne Doremus and Gaylen Gerber.

Her use of every day objects has evolved over the years based on her surroundings. In college, she incorporated beer bottles and packaging. After college, coffee cups appeared in her work. After becoming a mother, she included her children's worn-out clothing. Motherhood and her children have become some of the most influential factors in her work. Much of Hutchin's work is about the domestic sphere and human interaction with forms acting as substitutions for the human form. The furniture pieces used in her work were once in her own home.

The Portland Mercury reported in September 2006 that "her ceramics (steeped in a California funk attitude), papier-mâché sculptures, and collages share a crass aesthetic and a preoccupation with the thin line between disaster and success that disguise a genuine attempt to convey ideas about communion, fear, and loneliness." Her show at Reed College's Caseworks drew similar analysis.

Hutchins moved to Berlin in 2011 and returned to making paintings and wall-hung assemblages, having brought almost no materials with her. The paintings utilized everyday household objects such as folding chairs and china plates juxtaposed with transparent linen stretched over window-like frames.

Jessica Jackson Hutchins was included in the 2013 Venice Biennial by curator Massimiliano Gioni. In summer 2016, she was selected by artist and curator Michelle Grabner to participate in the 2016 Portland Biennial.

== Personal life ==
Hutchins is married to Pavement frontman Stephen Malkmus. They have two children, Lottie and Sunday.

== Exhibitions ==
=== 2016 ===
- Columbus, OH, Columbus College of Art and Design, Beeler Gallery, Jessica Jackson Hutchins, organized by Michael Goodson, June 13 – September 10 (solo)
- Portland, OR, Disjecta Contemporary Art Center, Portland2016 Biennial, curated by Michelle Grabner, July – September
- Louisville, KC, Kentucky Museum of Art and Craft, Material Issue: Subverting Form and Function
- Bronx, NY, Wave Hill, Glyndor Gallery, (Not So) Still Life, April 5 – July 4
- Los Angeles, CA, Redling Fine Art, April 2 – May 14
- Portland, OR, Adams and Ollman, esprit: Jessica Jackson Hutchins, Matthew Kirk, Memory Jugs and Philadelphia Wireman, March 18 – April 16

=== 2015 ===
- Stanford, CA, Cantor Arts Center at Stanford University, Oshman Family Gallery, Mining the Ancient, October 14, 2015 – August 29, 2016
- Rome, Italy, Fondazione GIULIANI, Consequences, curated by Jay Heikes, October 9 – December 12
- Chicago, IL, Kavi Gupta Gallery, Assisted, curated by Jessica Stockholder, September 12, 2015 – January 16, 2016
- Portland, OR, The Lumber Room and The Cooley Gallery at Reed College, Jessica Jackson Hutchins: Confessions, September 2 – November 8 (solo)
- New York, Junior Projects, Rock Hound Swap Meet, organized by Randy Wray, July 9 – August 13
- New York, NY, Marianne Boesky Gallery, I Do Choose, May 9 – June 13 (solo)
- New York, Jack Hanley Gallery, Zabriskie Point, January 9 – February 8

=== 2014 ===
- Innsbruck, Austria, Galerie im Taxispalais, Living in the Material World, December 6, 2014 – February 15, 2015
- Richmond, VA, Reynolds Gallery, Terra Firma, November 7 – December 24
- Los Angeles, ACME, Ok Great Thanks This Is So Ridiculous, June 7 – July 12
- Berlin, Germany, Johann König, Coming II, May 3 – May 24 (solo)
- Krefeld, Germany, Museen Haus Lange Haus Esters, Living in the Material World, April 6 – October 8
- Ridgefield, CT, The Aldrich Contemporary Art Museum, Unicorn, April 6 – September 21 (solo)
- New York, The Highline, Archeo, April 2014 – March 2015
- Milwaukee, WI, Green Gallery, No. 1 Rainbow, March 19 – April 27 (solo)
- Portland, OR, Adams and Ollman, The Ground, March 7 – April 26
- Amsterdam, Grimm Gallery, Trieste, organized by Jay Heikes, February 1 – March 15
- London, UK, Timothy Taylor Gallery, January 31 – March 8 (solo)
- East Lansing, MI, Eli and Edythe Broad Art Museum, Michigan State University, The Genres: Still Life Featuring Jessica Jackson Hutchins, December 13, 2013 – March 23, 2014 (solo)

=== 2013 ===
- Cleveland, Museum of Contemporary Art Cleveland, The Suburban, November 1, 2013 – February 16, 2014
- West Yorkshire, UK, Hepworth Wakefield Museum, Jessica Jackson Hutchins, February 16 – May 12 (solo)

=== 2012 ===
- Rome, Brand New Gallery, Changing States of Matter, May 31 – July 28
- Rome, Federica Schiavo Gallery, Trieste, March 31 – June 23
- Brussels, Gladstone Gallery, Prima Materia, March 30 – April 28
- Stamford, Franklin Street Works, House Arrest, April 5 – June 20
- London, The Saatchi Gallery, Objectified: Sculpture Today

=== 2011 ===
- Boston, MA, ICA Boston, Jessica Jackson Hutchins, October 28, 2011 – March 4 (solo)
- Lyon, France, A Terrible Beauty is Born: 11th Biennale de Lyon, catalogue, September 15 – December 31
- New York, Laurel Gitlen, Ryan Foerster, Jessica Jackson Hutchins, Chadwick Rantanen, September 14 – October 23
- Seattle, Seattle Art Museum, Reclaimed: Nature and Place Through Contemporary Eyes, June 30 – September 11
- New York, Salon 94, Paul Clay, June 23 – August 12, 2011
- Atlanta, GA, Atlanta Contemporary Art Center, Jessica Jackson Hutchins: The Important Thing About a Chair, April 8 – June 19 (solo)
- London, Museum 52, Memories Are Made Of This, April 7 – May 12, 2011
- Portland, OR, Elizabeth Leach Gallery, Here/Now, February 7 – April 2
- New York, Marianne Boesky Gallery, Dwelling, February 3 – April 2

=== 2010 ===
- London, UK, Timothy Taylor Gallery, Champions, October 13 – November 6 (solo)
- Portland, OR, Portland Institute for Contemporary Art, Children of the Sunshine, September 9 – October 17 (solo)
- New York, NY, Laurel Gitlen, Over Come Over, February 21 – March 28 (solo)
- New York, NY, Derek Eller Gallery, Kitchen Table Allegory, February 20 – March 28 (solo)
- New York, Whitney Museum of American Art, The Whitney Biennial, 2010, catalogue, February 25 – May 30
- Saratoga Springs, NY, The Tang Museum, The Jewel Thief, curated by Ian Barry and Jessica Stockholder, September 18 – February 27, 2011
- Greensboro, NC, The Weatherspoon Art Museum, Art of Paper 2010, November 7, 2010 – February 6, 2011
- Stockholm, Milliken Gallery, Face Your Demons, May 12 – June 24
- Marylhurst, OR, Marylhurst University, Motherlode, April 19 – May 15
- Seattle, Olympic Sculpture Park, Seattle Art Museum, Summer Projects, summer 2010
- Seattle, Seattle Art Museum, Kurt, May 13 – September 9

=== 2009 ===
- Seattle, Western Bridge, Parenthesis, September 25 – December 29
- Philadelphia, Institute of Contemporary Art at the University of Pennsylvania, Dirt on Delight, April 16 – June 21; travelled to Minneapolis, The Dirt On Delight: Impulses That Form Clay, catalogue, July 11 – November 29
- Portland, OR, The Oregon College of Art and Craft, Bent
- New York, On Stellar Rays, LOVER, June 20 – July 26
- New York, David Nolan, Slough, curated by Steve DiBenedetto, May 28 – July 24
- Santa Barbara, Santa Barbara Contemporary Arts Forum, An Expanded Field of Possibilities, February 28 – May 24
- New York, Momenta Art, The Mood Back Home, February 13 – March 16
- New York, Laurel Gitlen, ARE YOU WITH ME?, January 4 – February 8

=== 2008 ===
- Portland, OR, Small A Projects, Hours and Ours, 2008 (solo)
- Chicago, Rowley Kennerk, Presents, curated by Milwaukee International, December 19, 2008 – January 24, 2009
- New York, Laurel Gitlen, 200597214100022008, September 12 – October 5, 2008
- New York, White Columns, Begin Again Right Back There, curated by B. Wurtz, September 10 – October 25, 2008
- Portland, OR, PDX Contemporary Art, Kinda Like A Buffet, July 1 – August 2, 2008
- New York, CANADA, Journey to the Center of Uranus, July 11 – August 10, 2008
- New York, Derek Eller Gallery, Summer Group Exhibition, July 10 – August 15, 2008
- New York, NY, Derek Eller Gallery, The Exponent of Earth (You Make Me __), May 15 – July 3 (solo)

=== 2007 ===
- Portland, OR, Eric V. Hauser Memorial Library, Reed College, Case Works 12: Stylite Optimism (solo)
- Orange, CA, Chapman University, Home/Office Landscapes
- New York, Southfirst Gallery, Michelle Grabner's Never Quite Happy Home, September 14 – October 28
- Oak Park, IL, Shane Campbell Gallery, Ceramics
- New York, Derek Eller Gallery, Neo-Integrity, curated by Keith Mayerson, July 17 – August 24
- Ferndale, MI, Paul Kotula Projects, Hump
- Milawaukee, INOVA, Peck School of the Arts, University of Wisconsin, Place of the Transcommon, curated by Nicholas Frank, February 2 – March 16, 2008

=== 2006 ===
- Portland, OR, Small A Projects, Peace at Home: The War Never Left (solo)
- New York, Derek Eller Gallery, Summer Group Exhibition, June 29 - August 13
- New York, Alexandre Gallery, Your Beauty's Gold is Clay, June 28 – August 4
- Portland, OR, Small A Projects, Atlas of the Unknown, 2006
- New York, Derek Eller Gallery, Jessica Jackson Hutchins Relics from a Lonely Dinner, February 9 - March 11
- Philadelphia, Institute for Contemporary Art at the University of Pennsylvania, Gone Formalism, January 21 – March 26
- New York, Derek Eller Gallery, Inaugural Group Exhibition, January 12 - February 4
- Portland, OR, an event for Ghosttown with Red76, Lonely Dinner

=== 2005 ===
- New York, The Sculpture Center, Make it Now, catalogue, May 15 – July 31
- Frankfurt am Main, Germany, Parisa Kind Gallery, International Laundry
- New York, EFA, I live in a Castle, curated by Jessica Hutchins and Dan Torop

=== 2004 ===
- New York, Derek Eller Gallery, March 18 – April 17 (solo)
- New York, Champion Fine Art, Escapism: a viable political alternative, curated by Fia Backström, July 22 – August 20
- London, Anthony Wilkinson Gallery, Five Friends, a film and video 22 program
- New York, Debs & Co., Art Star/Sausage Factory, April 15 – May 8
- New York, Lombard-Freid Fine Art, Surface Tension, 2004
- Kent, UK, Herbert Read Gallery, Ascend to the End

== Collections ==
Hutchins's work is included in the collections of:

- Brooklyn Museum, New York
- The Hammer Museum, Los Angeles
- The Museum of Modern Art, New York
- Portland Art Museum, OR
- Tang Museum, Saratoga Springs, NY
- Seattle Art Museum, WA
- Whitney Museum of American Art, New York

== Publications ==
- "Confessions" was commissioned as part of Hutchins' two-space exhibition of the same name at the lumber room and the Douglas F. Cooley Memorial Art Gallery, Reed College. It was designed by Jessica Jackson Hutchins, Gary Robbins, and Heather Watkins and published by Container Corps in 2015.
- "Jessica Jackson Hutchins: Everything Erblaut" was published in 2013 by the Timothy Taylor Gallery and The Hepworth Wakefield. Kirsty Bell and Colin Lang are contributors (text), with design help from the Purtill Family Business.
- "Convivium" was a collaboration of the visual arts of Hutchins and poetry of Tom Fisher. Published by Publication Studio, 2010.
- Featured in the BOMB Magazine, edition no. 112 (Summer), in 2010, with an interview by Stuart Horodner.
