= Mark Neville =

British photographer (born 1966)

- Born: 1966 (age 59–60); London, England
- Education: University of Reading (BA); Goldsmiths' College (MA); Rijksakademie
- Known for: Social documentary photography, war art
- Notable work: Port Glasgow Book Project
- Patrons: Imperial War Museum; Daiwa Anglo-Japanese Foundation,
- Website: markneville.com

Mark Neville (born 1966) is a British social documentary photographer.

== Early life and education ==
Neville studied Fine Arts at Reading University, Berkshire (BA) and Goldsmiths' College in London (MA). He went on to study at the Rijksakademie in Amsterdam, but he was asked to leave after a violent incident with a female student.

== Career ==
From 2010-2011, Neville was the UK's official war artist. As part of his work under this charge, he created a small body of work based on two 1-month residencies with the British Army in the Afghan province of Helmand. Part of The Helmand Work showed at London's Imperial War Museum's Contemporary Art Gallery during its relaunch in Summer 2014. Neville was treated for Post-Traumatic Stress Disorder (PTSD) upon his return from Helmand. A selection of emails and prints from his book for this project, The Battle Against Stigma Book Project, was included in the touring group exhibition With Different Eyes – The Portrait in Contemporary Photography which opened at Die Photographische Sammlung/SK Stiftung Kultur and Kunstmuseum Bonn in 2016, and in Neville’s solo show Battle Against Stigma at QUAD in Derby, England in 2018.

In 2012, The New York Times Magazine commissioned Neville to make the photo essay Here is London, which examined wealth inequality in the capital, and which they subsequently nominated for The Pulitzer Prize. In 2016 Steidl published the first commercially available book on Neville's activist book practice. Fancy Pictures includes work from six of Neville's projects with an interview between David Campany and Neville and was shortlisted for the 2017 Paris Photo–Aperture Foundation PhotoBook Awards PhotoBook of the Year.

Begun June 2016 on the day Britain voted to leave the European Union Neville's Parade book project was commissioned by GwinZegal Centre of Art, in the town of Guingamp, France. Disgusted by the outcome of the Brexit vote, Neville decided to examine what community meant in Brittany ('Little Britain’), as a mirror to his own native country.

For many years, Neville lived and worked in London. In October 2020, he moved to Kyiv in Ukraine.

== Work ==
Neville is known for working at the interface of art and documentary utilising photography and films to capture the unique face of working communities.

Neville is best known for his Port Glasgow Book Project. This was made after he spent a year as artist in residence in Port Glasgow in 2004 portraying the town's hardship of Scotland's post-industrial decline in a photographic book which was distributed as a gift to members of the community.

Neville has worked on commissioned projects by The Andy Warhol Museum in Pittsburgh (Braddock/Sewickley, 2012) and Mount Stuart on the Isle of Bute (Fancy Pictures, 2008).

Neville's work Deeds Not Words, which addresses the Corby community involved in the toxic waste disposal court case, was exhibited in 2013 at The Photographers' Gallery in London.

Neville’s 2017 project Child’s Play continued his investigation into mental health issues by examining the importance of play in personal development. Neville’s project made a link between the closures of adventure playgrounds in Britain’s urban areas and a drastic rise in cases of depression and anxiety among young people and children. Neville feels that taking and exhibiting photographs is not enough in these instances, the images have to be shared in a way that actually makes a difference.

== Awards ==
- 2013: Nominated, Pulitzer Prize, by The New York Times Magazine for his photo essay Here Is London
- 2017: Shortlisted, PhotoBook of the Year, Paris Photo–Aperture Foundation PhotoBook Awards, for his book Fancy Pictures
- 2018: Shortlisted, Daiwa Foundation Art Prize along with Kate Groobey and Keith Milow
- 2019: Nominated, Deutsche Börse Photography Foundation Prize 2020, London for his book Parade; also exhibited at The Photographers' Gallery, London. The other nominations were Clare Strand, Mohamed Bourouissa and Anton Kusters.

== Publications ==
- Port Glasgow. Self-published, 2004. Edition of 8000 copies. (Note: Neville's page about Port Glasgow)
- Deeds Not words. Self-published, 2011. Edition of 500 copies. (Note: Neville's page about Deeds Not Words)
- London/Pittsburgh. London: Alan Cristea Gallery, 2014. ISBN 978-0957508576.
- Battle Against Stigma. Self-published, 2015. Two volumes; one volume has photographs by Neville and text by Neville and Jamie Hacker Hughes, the other volume contains written testimonies from various soldiers. OCLC 918969112. (Note: Neville's page about Battle against Stigma)
- Child's Play. London: Foundling Museum, 2017. OCLC 1156951143. Edition of 500 copies. (Note: Neville's page about Child's Play)
- Fancy Pictures. Göttingen, Germany: Steidl, 2016. ISBN 978-3-86930-908-8. Includes work from six of Neville's projects. With an interview between David Campany and Neville, "Fancy Pictures". (Note: Steidl's page about Fancy Pictures)
- Parade. Guingamp, France: GwinZegal, 2019. ISBN 979-10-94060-25-4. (Note: Neville's page about Parade) (Note: GwinZegal's page about Parade)
- Stop Tanks with Books. Nazraeli, 2022. ISBN 978-1-59005-564-9. Photographs by Neville and short stories by Lyuba Yakimchuk. Edited by David Campany. (Note: Neville's page about Stop Tanks with Books) (Note: Nazraeli's page about Stop Tanks with Books)
