= Margareta Hallerdt =

Swedish archaeologist

Maj Hanna Margareta Hallerdt, also Weidhagen Hallerdt, née Esbjörnsson, (1927–2018) was a Swedish archaeologist and former museum curator. She has undertaken important archaeological work in Helsingborg around St Clemens Church indicating the existence of a wooden church there in the early 11th century.

== Biography ==
Born in Lund, Hallerdt was the daughter of engineer Åke Esbjörnsson (1883–1974) and the gymnast Sigrid Andersén (1891–1985). In 1949, she married Stig Weidhagen and, in 1968, the writer and curator Björn Hallerdt. She studied at Lund University, graduating in 1953 and earning a licentiate in 1972. She first worked at the Kalmar County Museum (1953–55) before joining the staff of Helsingborg Museum until 1964. Thereafter she served as curator in Lund, Norrbotten County Museum and, from 1984, senior curator at the Stockholm City Museum and director of the Museum of Medieval Stockholm.

She bore three daughters, Katarina Weidhagen, Miriam Andersén and Malena Hallerdt.

Documenting her extensive archaeological work in Helsingborg, in 2010 Weidhagen-Hallerdt published her S:t Clemens kyrka i Helsingborg (St Clemens Church in Helsingborg).
