= Museum of Medieval Stockholm =

Museum in Stockholm, Sweden

The Museum of Medieval Stockholm
- Medeltidsmuseet

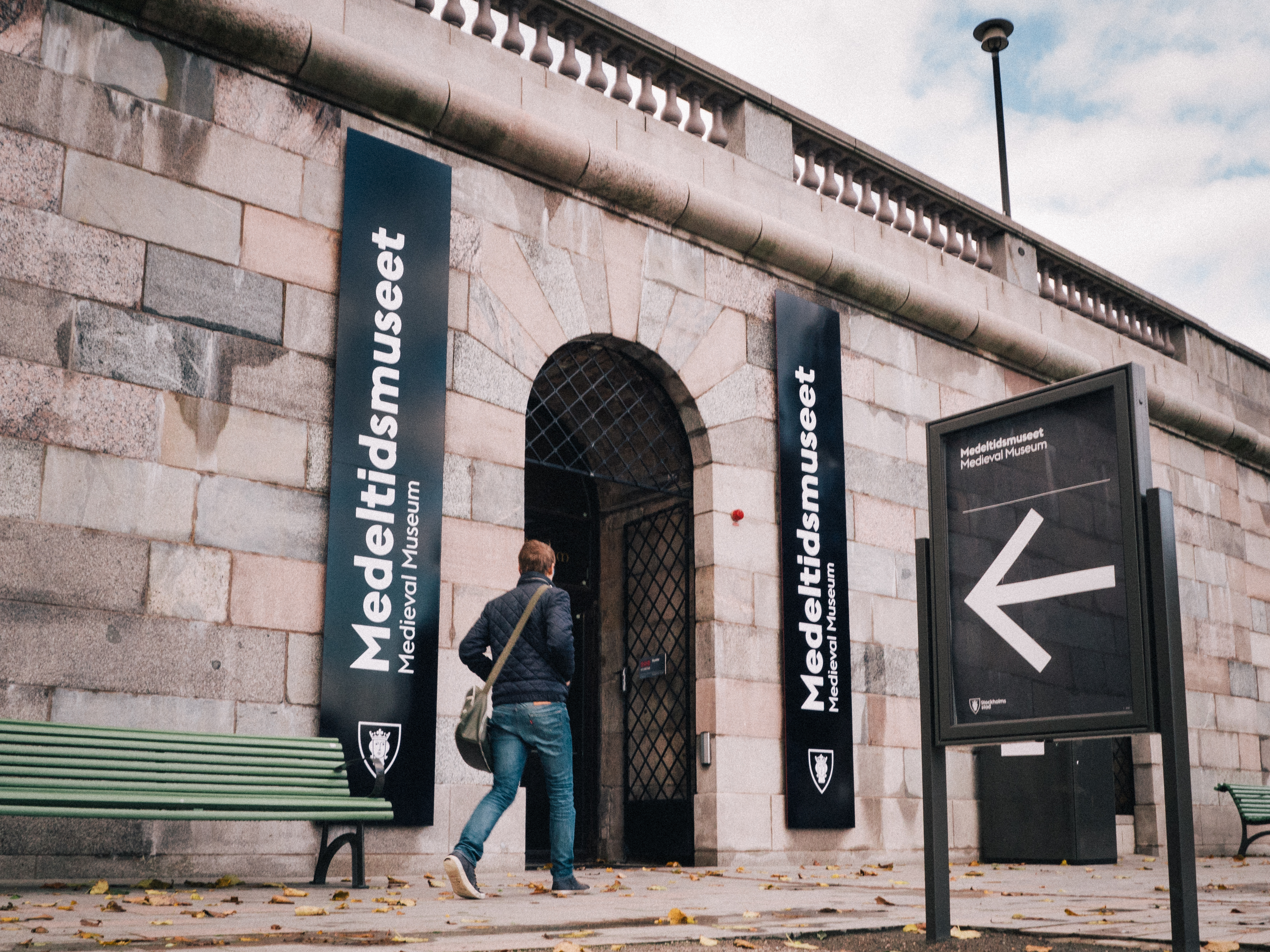
- Entrance to the Museum of Medieval Stockholm
- Established: 22 May 1986
- Location: Stockholm, Sweden
- Coordinates: 59°19′42″N 18°4′13″E
- Website: medeltidsmuseet.stockholm.se

The Museum of Medieval Stockholm (Swedish: Stockholms medeltidsmuseum) is a museum in Stockholm, Sweden, devoted to the history of the city during the Middle Ages. It was established in 1986 around archaeological remains discovered during extensive excavations on Helgeandsholmen, just north of the Royal Palace. The museum received the European Museum of the Year Award in the year of its opening.

== History ==
=== Establishment ===
In the late 1970s, extensive archaeological excavations were carried out on Helgeandsholmen in connection with plans for an underground parking garage attached to the country's Parliament House. The excavation site became known as the Riksgropen ("National Pit" or "State Pit"). Among the discoveries were remains of Stockholm's city wall dating from the early 16th century.

The plans for the underground garage were scaled back in order to preserve the archaeological remains and make them accessible to the public. The Museum of Medieval Stockholm was subsequently constructed around the excavated site and inaugurated in 1986. Museum director Margareta Hallerdt oversaw the creation of the museum, which was designed by artist Kerstin Rydh. It received national and international attention and was awarded the European Museum of the Year Award in 1986.

=== Renovation ===
The museum was closed from 15 June 2007 until early 2010 during restoration work on the Norrbro bridge. During the closure, the permanent exhibition was rebuilt, while a smaller temporary exhibition was presented at Kulturhuset at Sergels torg.

=== Relocation ===
The museum closed its premises at Norrbro in November 2023 in preparation for a move to Börshuset at Stortorget in the Old Town. The move followed a decision for the Riksdag Administration to take over the museum's former premises. Börshuset was occupied by the Nobel Prize Museum, which was itself scheduled to relocate.

== Collections and exhibitions ==
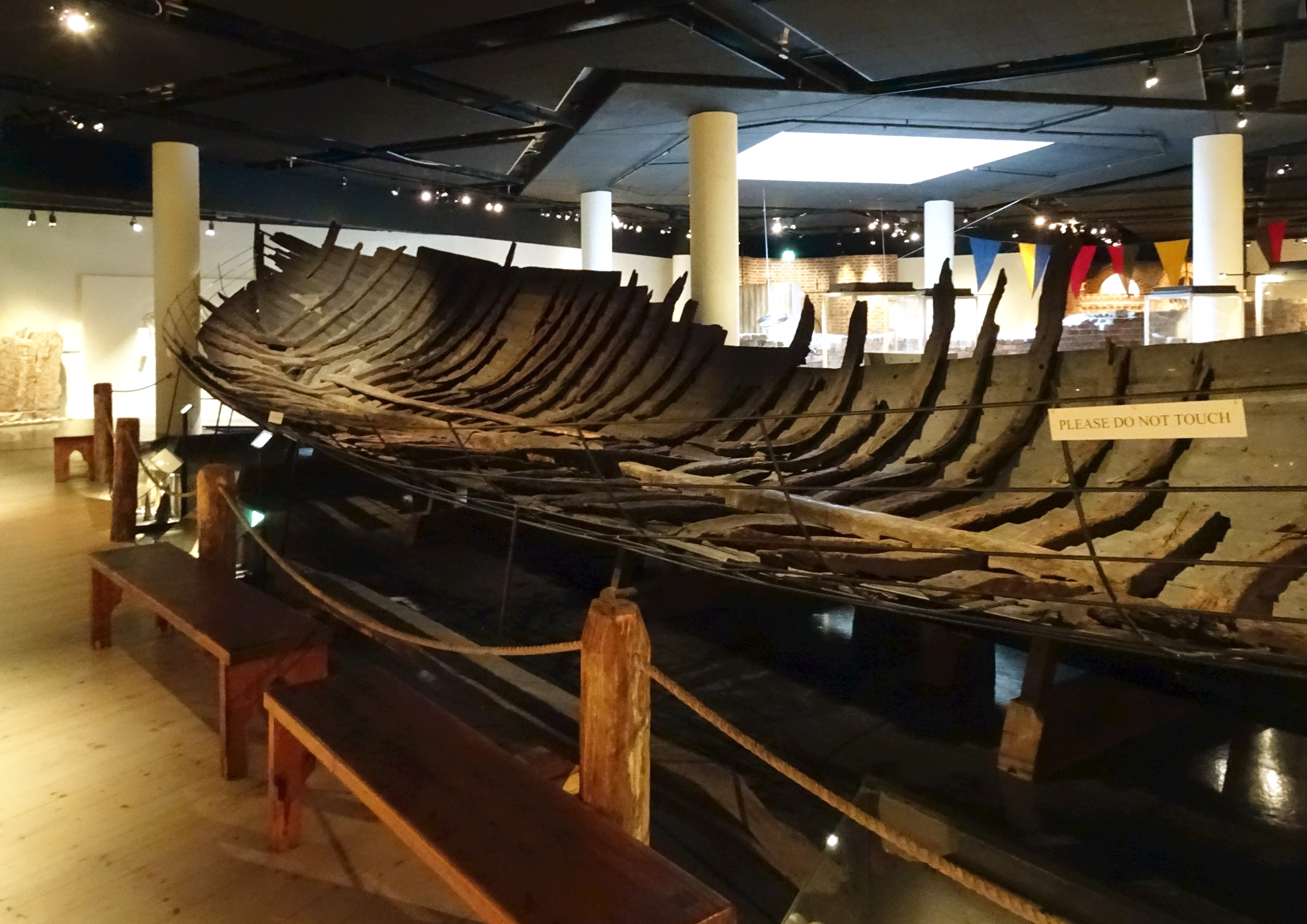
Riddarholmsskeppet

The museum presents the history of medieval Stockholm from the 1250s to the 1520s. Its displays recreate elements of the medieval city, including brick houses, market booths, workshops, a harbour and gallows, alongside archaeological remains and objects discovered in Stockholm.

In 2010, to mark 800 years since the birth of Birger Jarl, traditionally regarded as the founder of Stockholm, the museum opened an exhibition featuring a reconstruction of his face.

== Activities ==
The Museum of Medieval Stockholm produces temporary exhibitions focusing on medieval history and organizes lectures, symposia and other programmes. Its educational activities are aimed particularly at children, young people and schools. The museum also operates a shop selling books about the Middle Ages, postcards and jewellery.

== See also ==
- List of museums in Stockholm
- Stockholm City Museum
- Stockholm County Museum
