= Ammoniaphone =

Ammoniaphone was a dubious medical device invented by Dr. Robert Carter Moffat. It was a long tube with two small compartments for liquid on each end, with the user breathing the "Italianised air" through the opening in the middle. It was introduced to the public during a concert in London in 1884, and advertised as improving the voice and a cure-all for all sorts of throat problems.

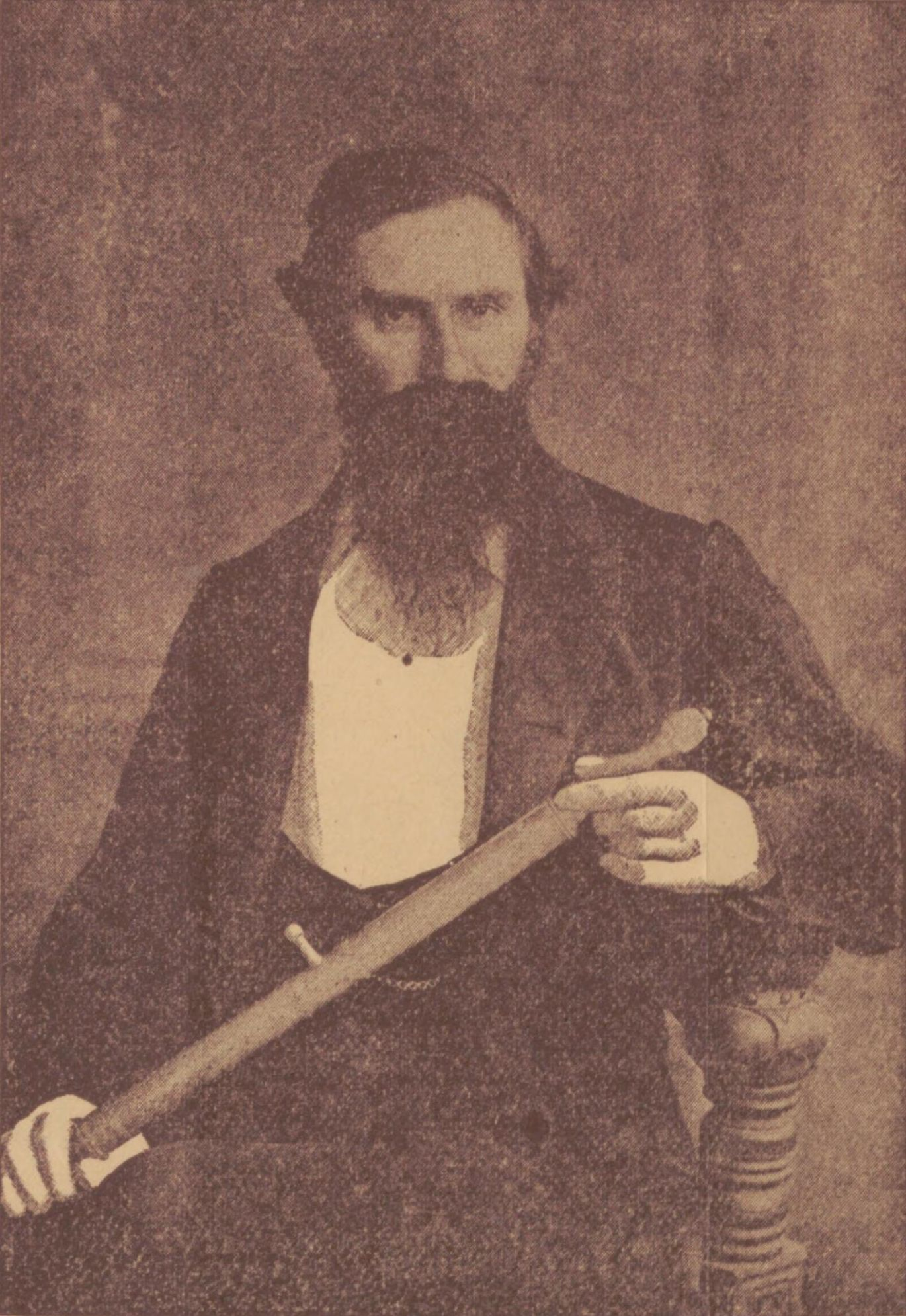
Dr. Moffat with his Ammoniaphone

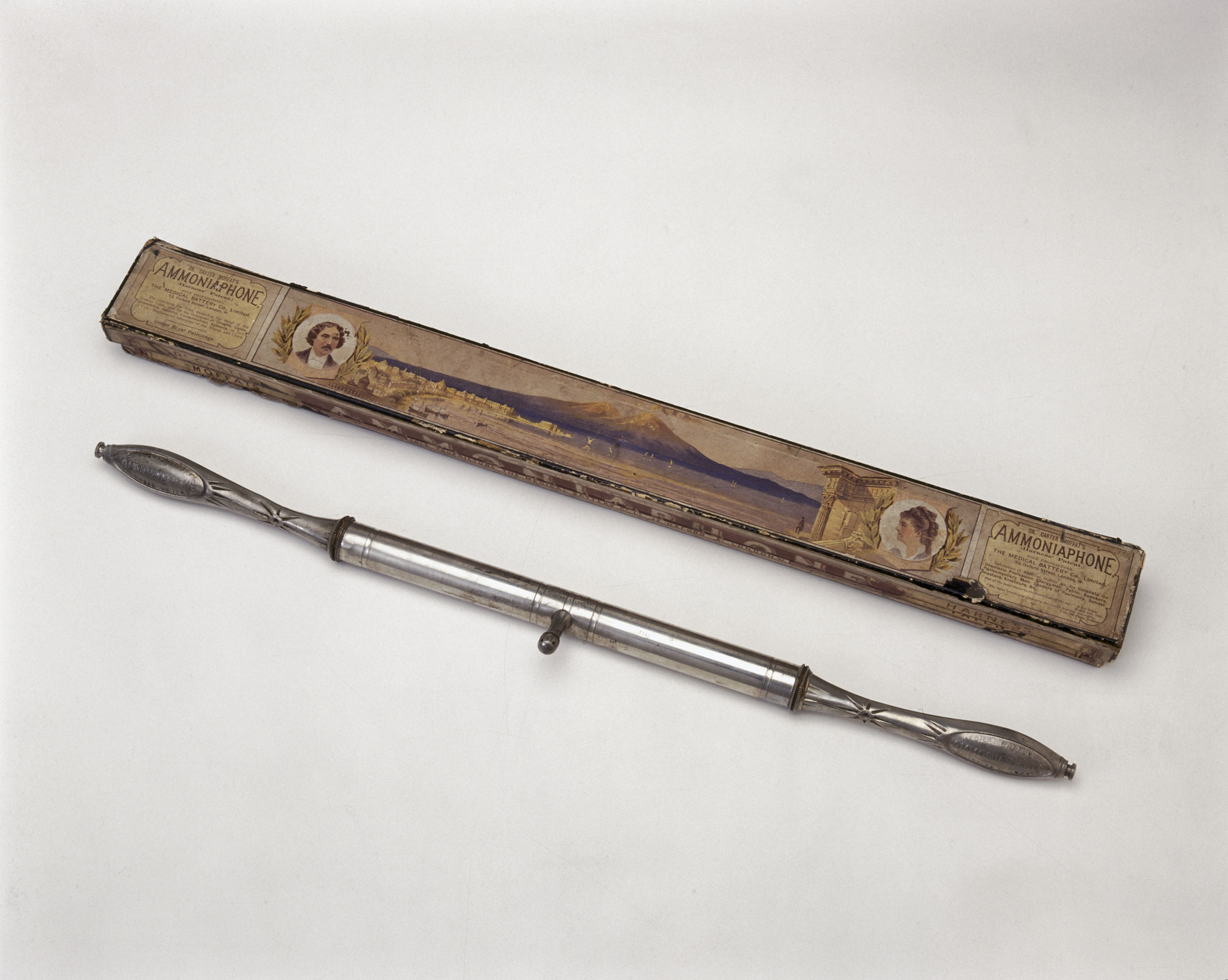
The Ammoniaphone. Credit: Wellcome Collection

== Background ==
Carter Moffat thought that the explanation that so many good singers came from Italy must have something to do with the air. When given the opportunity to travel to Italy (according to a newspaper clipping to solve a chemical problem of industrial importance – an assignment he completed so successfully that he was awarded a diploma of honor and a gold medal by the Italian government) he set about testing the air in Italy and discovered that, along with traces of essential oils from herb gardens, Italian air contained considerable amounts of "peroxide of hydrogen", and "free ammonia". He then created a device that could administer these two substances in appropriate doses.

Laryngologist Sir Morell Mackenzie tested the instrument, and came to the conclusion that it had no measurable effect.

Ammoniaphone M812 is on permanent display at the Swedish Museum of Performing Arts / Scenkonstmuseet and Stiftelsen Musikkulturens Främjande.
