= List of alumni of King's College, Cambridge =

Notable alumni of King's College, Cambridge include prime ministers, archbishops, presidents, and academics.

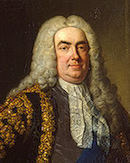
Robert Walpole, first Prime Minister of Great Britain

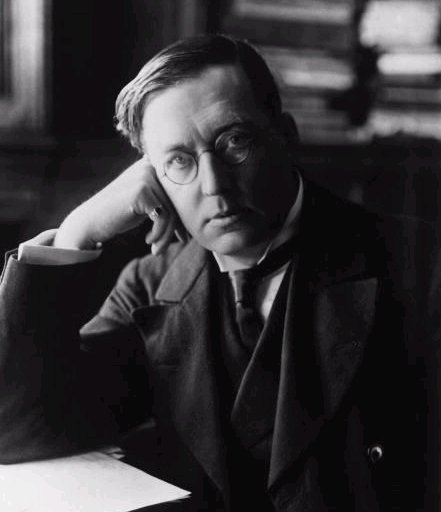
M. R. James, scholar and ghost-story writer

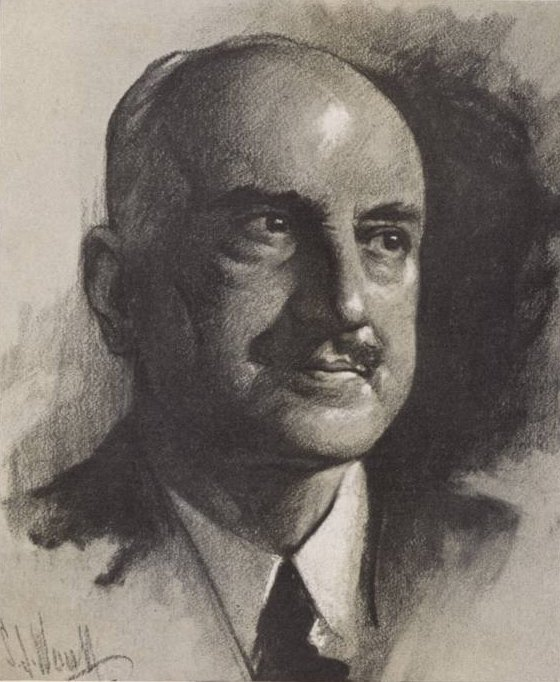
George Santayana, philosopher

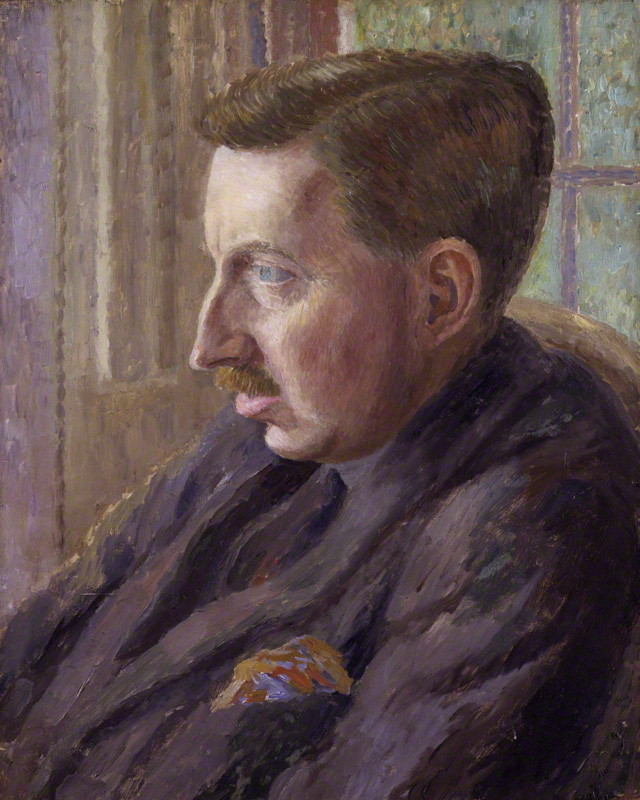
E. M. Forster, novelist

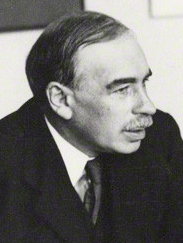
John Maynard Keynes, economist

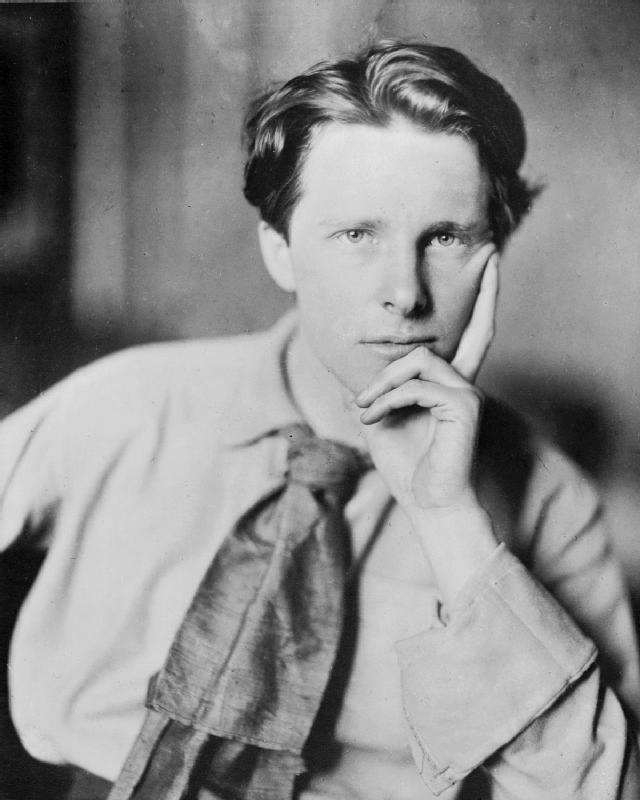
Rupert Brooke, poet

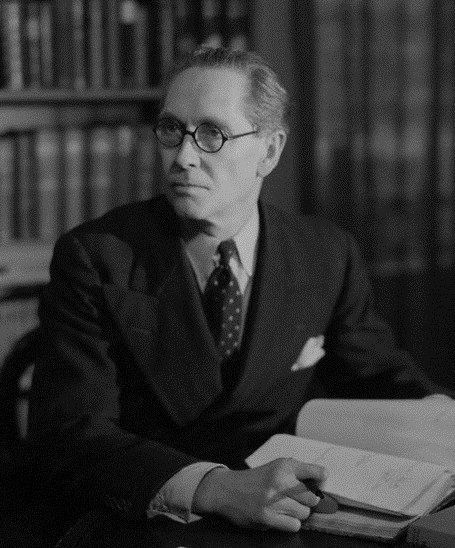
Philip Noel-Baker, Olympic medallist and Nobel laureate in peace

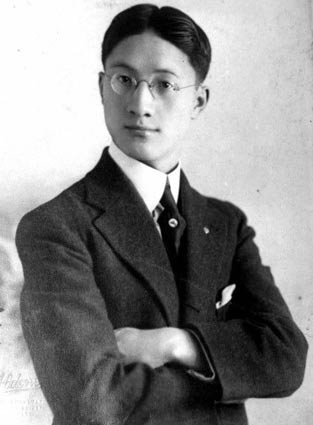
Xu Zhimo, poet

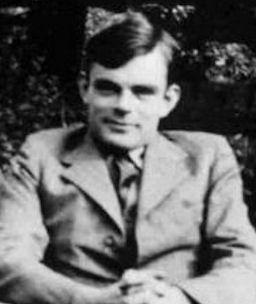
Alan Turing, mathematician and computer scientist

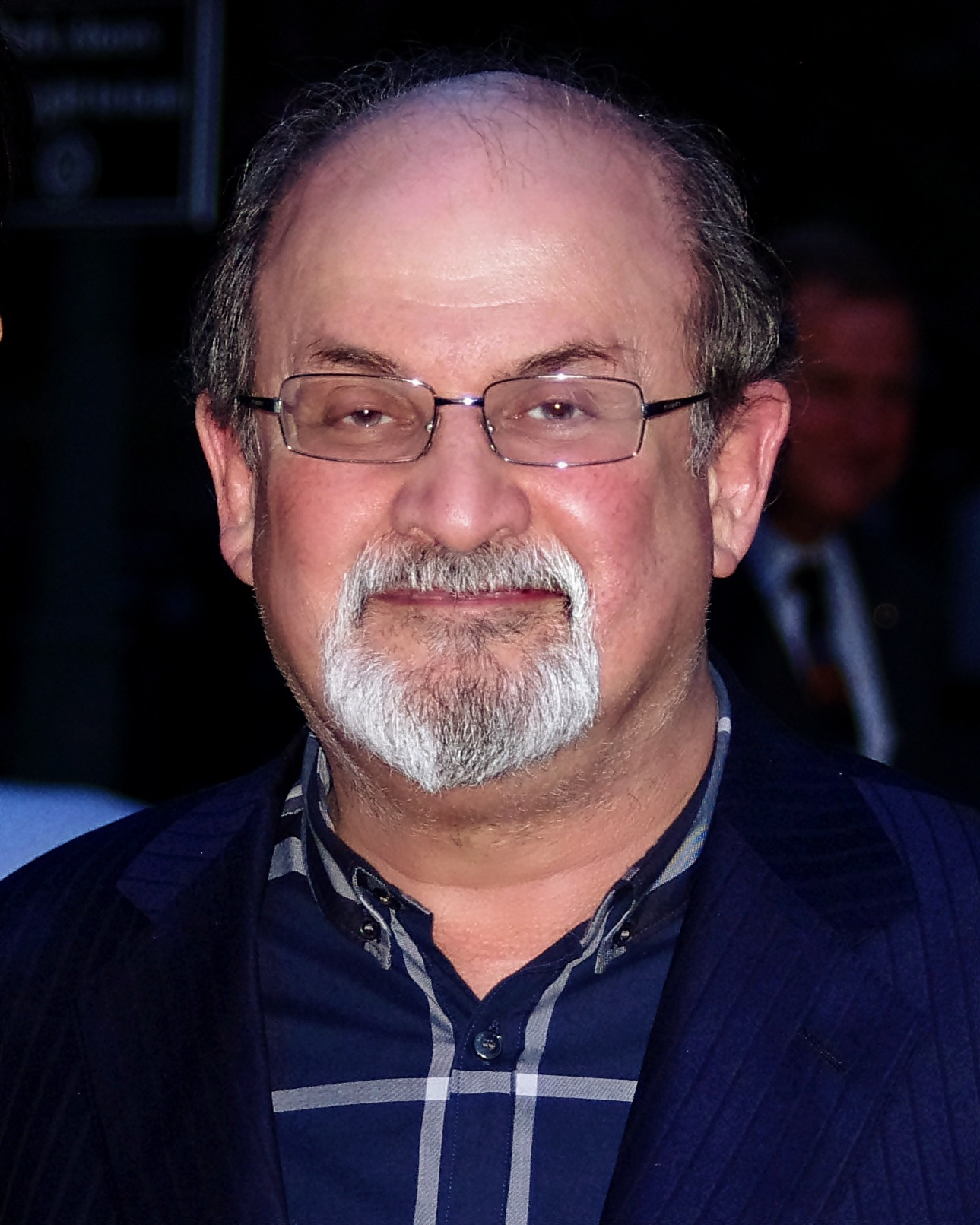
Salman Rushdie, novelist

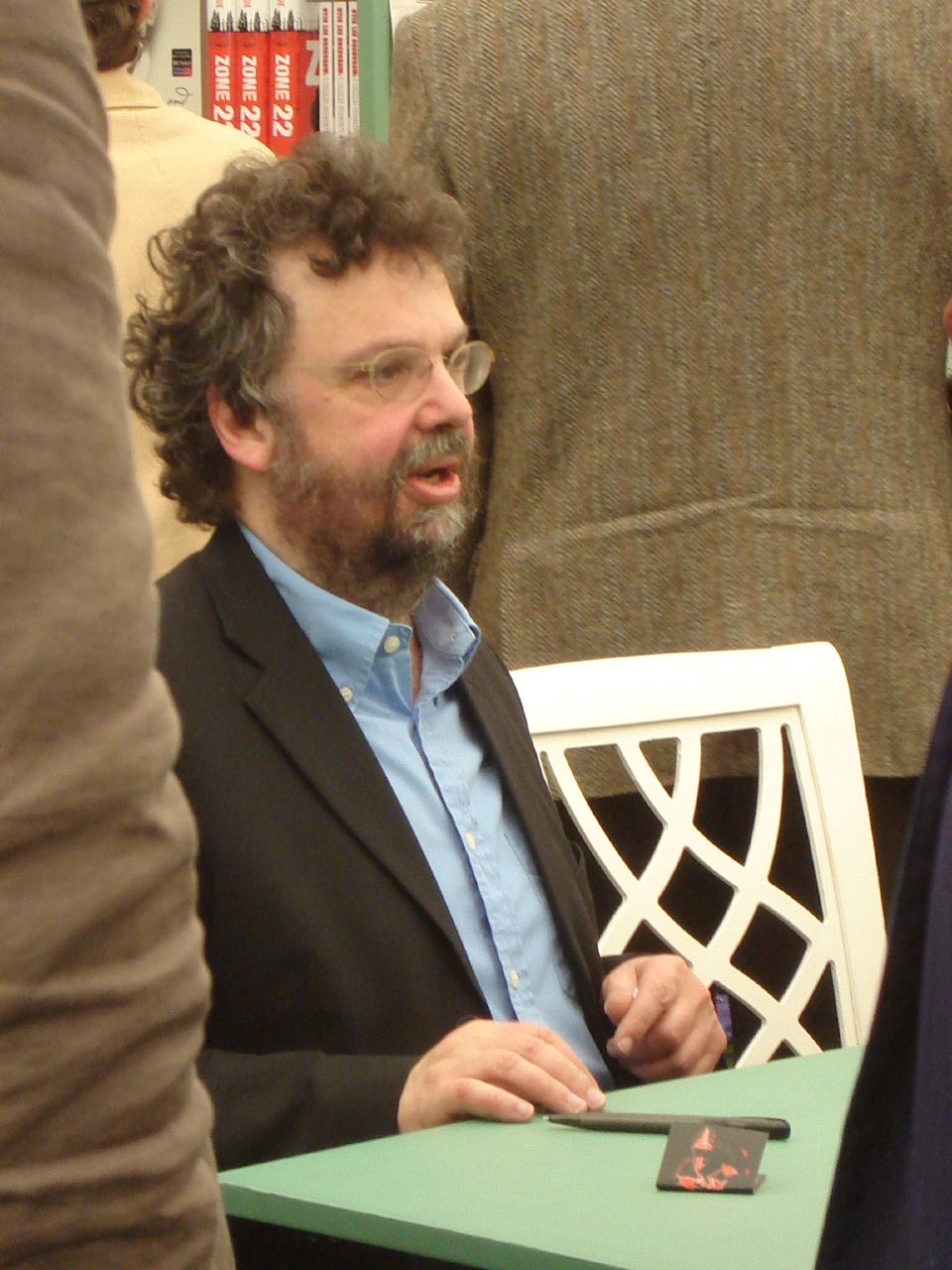
Stephen Poliakoff, playwright and director

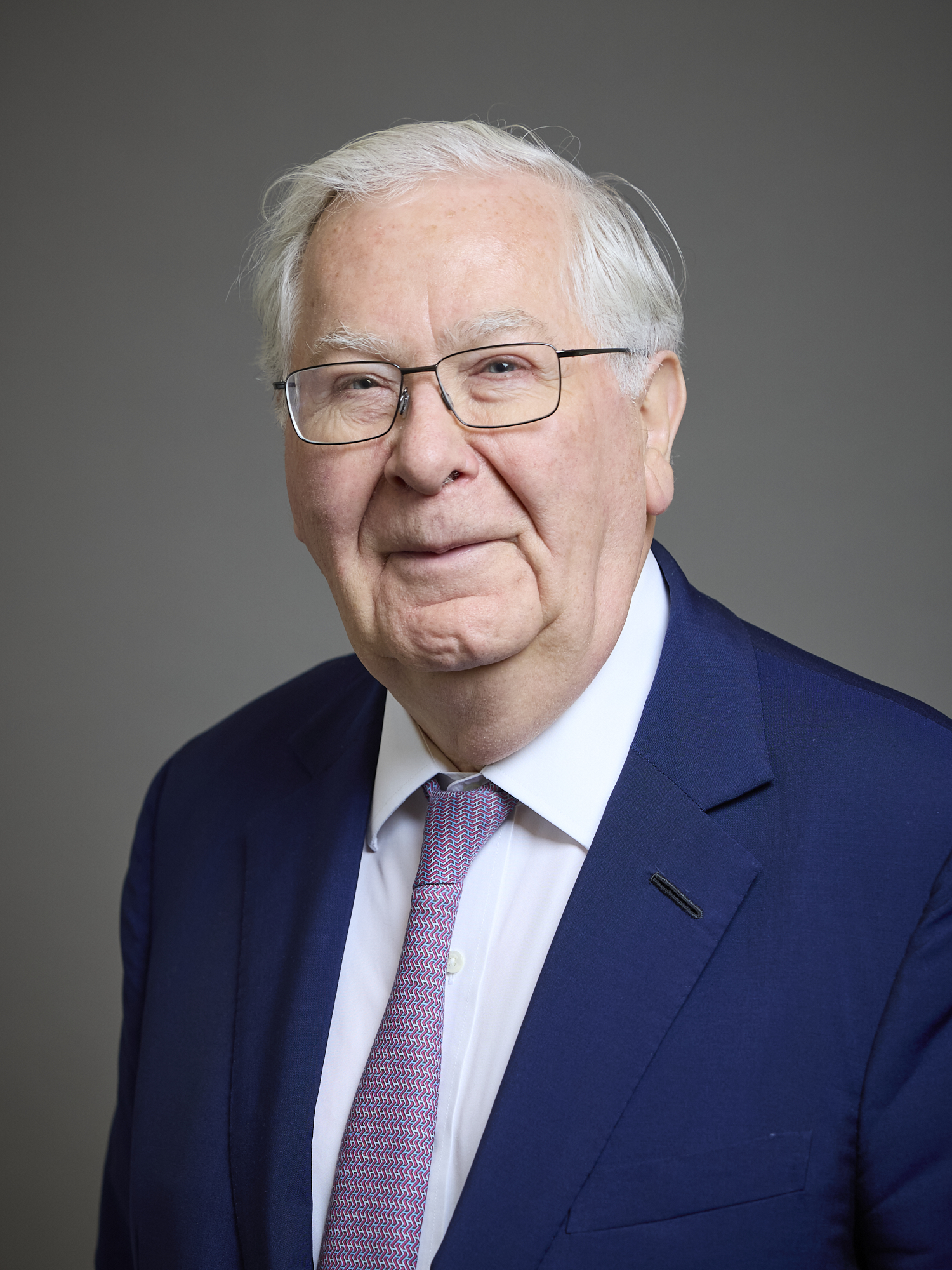
Mervyn King, former Governor of the Bank of England

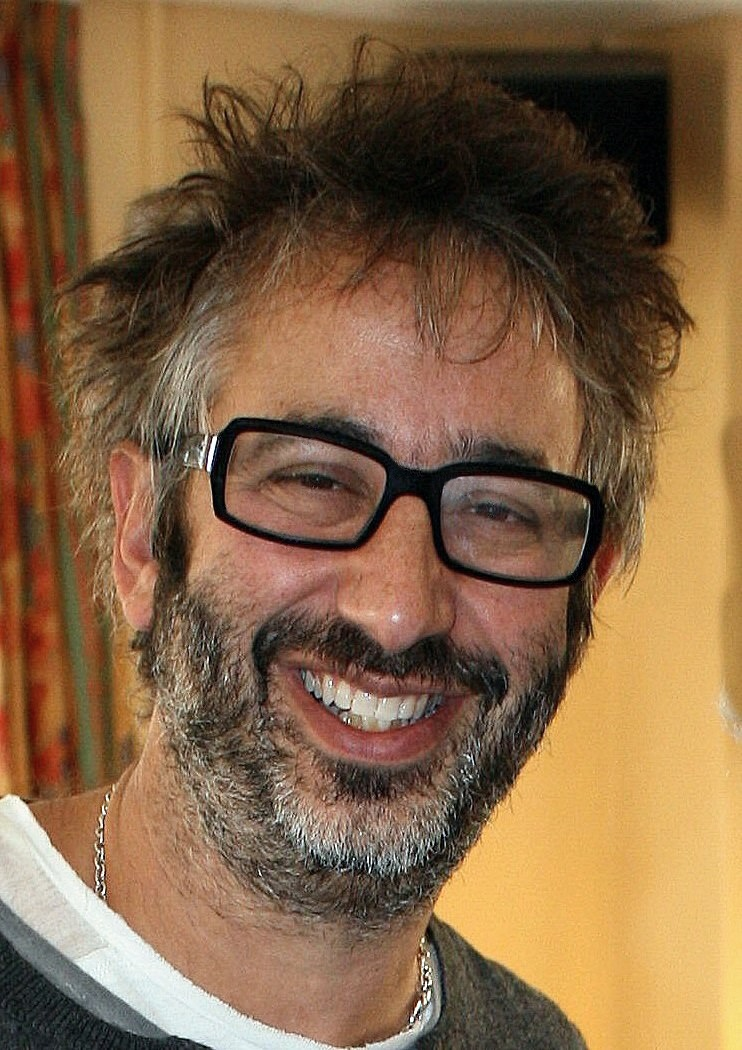
David Baddiel, comedian

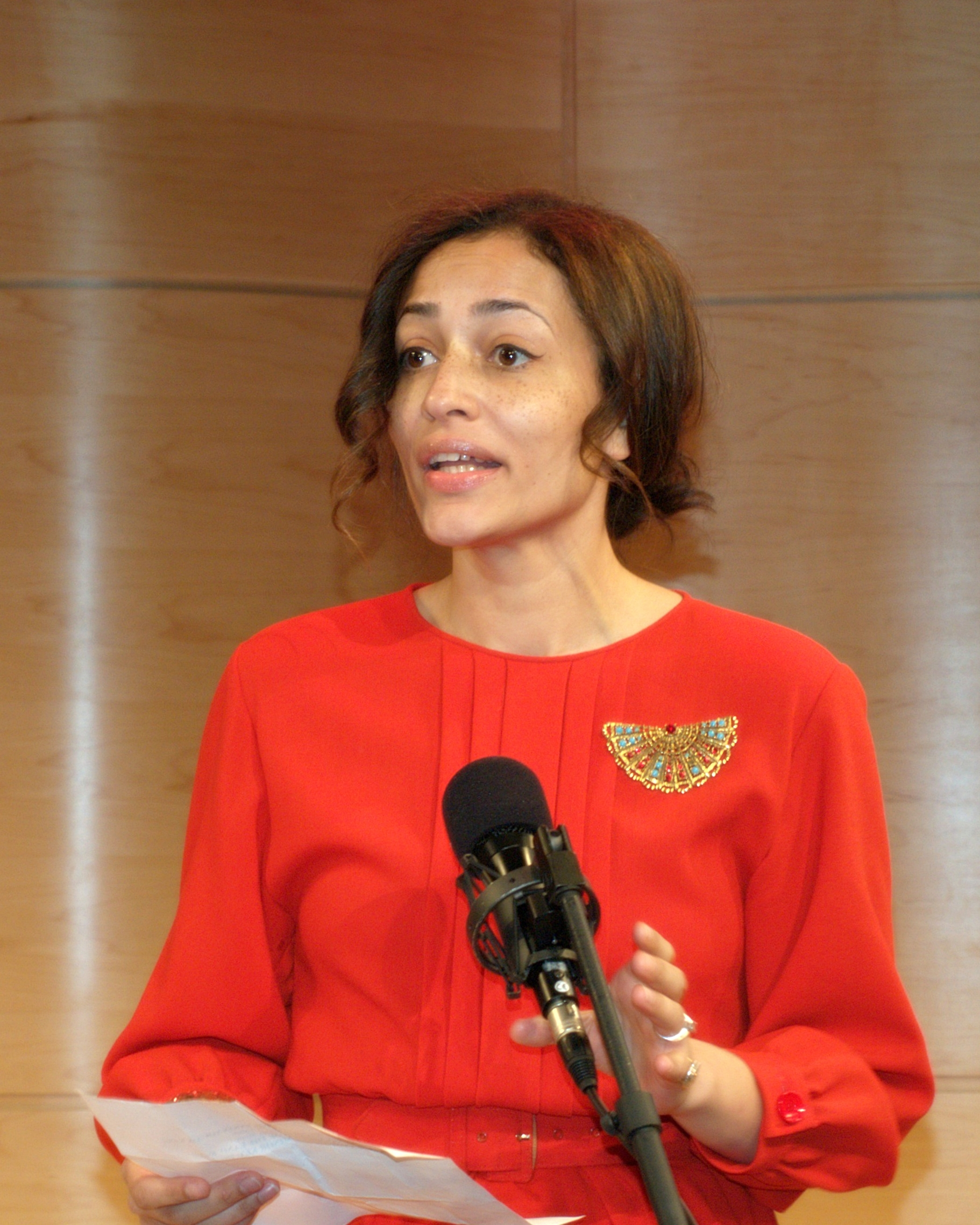
Zadie Smith, novelist

== Politicians ==
- Martin Bell, former politician and reporter
- Charles Clarke, former British Home Secretary
- Philip Noel-Baker, politician, Olympic medallist and recipient of a Nobel Prize
- Charles Pratt, 1st Earl Camden, judge and Lord Chancellor
- David Sainsbury, Baron Sainsbury of Turville, peer and Chancellor of the University of Cambridge
- Charles Townshend, 2nd Viscount Townshend, Secretary of State, who was also known for his interest in agriculture and his role in the British Agricultural Revolution
- Robert Walpole, the first Prime Minister of Great Britain
- Francis Walsingham, spymaster to Queen Elizabeth I of England

== Law ==
- Robert Alexander, Baron Alexander of Weedon, barrister and vice-chancellor
- Nicholas Phillips, Baron Phillips of Worth Matravers, former President of the British Supreme Court
- Dame Eleanor Sharpston, former Advocate General at the Court of Justice of the European Union

== Clergy ==
- Richard Cox, Chancellor of Oxford before appointment as Dean of Westminster and eventually Bishop of Ely
- John Frith, 16th-century Protestant martyr
- John Sumner, Archbishop of Canterbury
- William Thomas

== Writers ==
- J. G. Ballard, author
- Rupert Brooke, poet
- E. M. Forster, author
- Sir John Harington, author and translator of Aristotle
- Martin Jacques, author
- M. R. James, writer and medievalist (student, fellow, and Provost)
- Stephen Poliakoff, playwright
- Walter Raleigh, poet
- Salman Rushdie, author
- Zadie Smith, author
- Patrick White, Australian novelist and playwright and Nobel Prize winner
- Xu Zhimo, poet

== Media and musicians ==
- Thomas Ades, composer
- Julian Anderson, composer
- David Baddiel, comedian
- George Benjamin, composer
- Lily Cole, model, author and actress
- James Gilchrist, tenor
- King's Singers, Grammy Award-winning a cappella group
- John Spiers, folk musician
- Phil Wang, comedian
- Judith Weir, composer (Master of the Queen's Music)
- John Whitworth, countertenor
- Tim Mead, countertenor

== Scientists and academics ==
- Benedict Anderson, historian
- Edgar Anstey, psychologist
- Charles Glover Barkla, physicist, awarded the Nobel Prize in Physics in 1917
- Henry Widdowson, linguist
- John Craven, economist
- John Dunn, political theorist
- Richard Fortey, palaeontologist
- Anthony Giddens, sociologist
- Oliver Hart, economist who received the Nobel Memorial Prize in Economic Sciences in 2016
- Geoffrey Hinton, computer scientist, awarded the Nobel Prize in Physics in 2024
- Eric Hobsbawm, historian
- Charles Inglis, engineer
- Tony Judt, historian
- John Maynard Keynes, economist and philosopher
- Karl Pearson, mathematician and eugenicist
- George Santayana, philosopher

== Businesspeople ==
- Hermann Hauser, technology entrepreneur of Acorn and ARM
- Mervyn King, Baron King of Lothbury, Governor of the Bank of England
- Jason James, director and expert on UK/Japan relations
