= Oliver Weber =

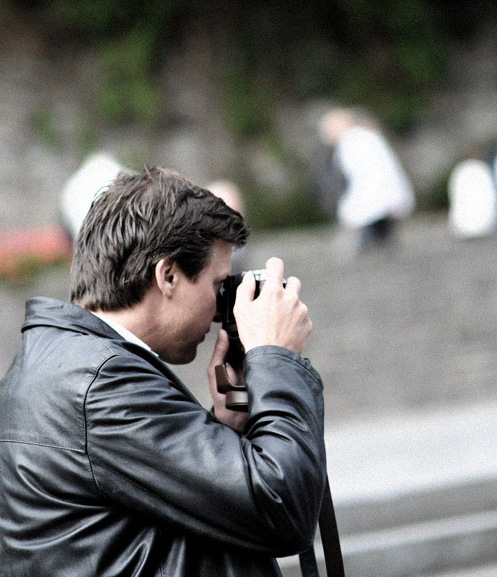
- Born: 7 September 1970 (age 55); Munich, West Germany
- Known for: Photography

Oliver Weber (born 7 September 1970 in Munich, West Germany) is a German photographer, Physician and Professor of Visual arts. Currently he lives and works on the Canary Island of La Gomera. His specialty areas are reportage, portrait and what has come to be recognized as street photography.

He has become more widely known through numerous features with magazines and publishing houses: BBC, ARD, Bertelsmann, Die Zeit, Random House, Merian (magazine), Stern (magazine).

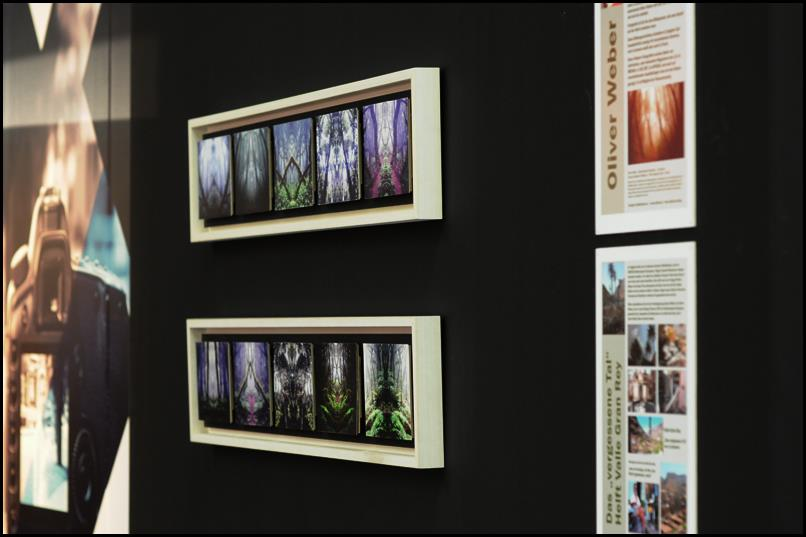
Installation of Oliver Weber's Magical Forest series at the Photokina 2012

2009 an interview with Oliver Weber has been added to the TWO WAY LENS – project. The list of photographers already included is like a "who's who" of the contemporary fine art photography scene, like Magnum Photosphotographer Martin Parr or Alec Soth and Amy Stein. Oliver Weber is the first German Photographer who is included in Two Way Lens.

2011 Oliver Weber published his second book ANALOGUE, which was featured by The Camera Club of New York during its photo book fair July 2011.

2012 Weber took part on several "solo" and "group" exhibitions including his work, like the DOCUMENTA (13) in Kassel, Germany (one of the world's most important exhibitions for contemporary art) and the photokina in Cologne, Germany (the world's largest trade fair for the photographic and imaging industries).

2015 he received his Professor of Visual arts at California University.

== Selected exhibitions ==
- Fidels Kinder, Passau City, Germany (2005)
- Humans, Foto 21 Gallery, Bredevoort, Netherlands (2007)
- Contactos, Arte Novum Gallery, Göttingen, Germany (2008)
- Marrakech, Bochum (Germany) - group exhibition, (2011)
- Polaroids, DOCUMENTA (13), Kassel, Germany - group exhibition (2012)
- Humans, G.P. Kelly Stiftung, Gammertingen-Harthausen, Germany (2012)
- Curious Camera Event, ArtsEye Gallery, Tucson, AZ, USA (2012)
- Magical Forest, Rotunde, Bochum, Germany – group exhibition (2012)
- Magical Forest, A Smith Gallery, Johnson City, TX, USA (2012)
- Magical Forest, Photokina, Cologne, Germany (2012)
- Social Life at Beach, Affordable Art Fair, Hamburg, Germany (2012)
- Would You Recognize Alfie Payne at a Steam Fair?, Alfie's House, Bridport (2013)
- Social Life at Beach, Galerie Lichtkreuzung, Munich, Germany (2013)
- Social Life at Beach, 8. Internationales Medien Festival, Munich, Germany (2015)

== Books ==
- Captain Flint, Photo Art Books (2016), ISBN 978-1-32653-811-8
- La Gomera, Havana, Moscow, Kulturbuchverlag (2007), ISBN 978-3-88961-133-8
- Das Fotoshooting-Buch: Menschen & Porträt, Galileo Design Verlag (2009), ISBN 978-3-8362-1392-9
- Social Life at Beach, Creative, Inc. (2013), ISBN 978-1-4928-318-0-8
