= The Camera Club of New York =

Organization in New York City

Coordinates: 40°45′17″N 73°59′38.4″W

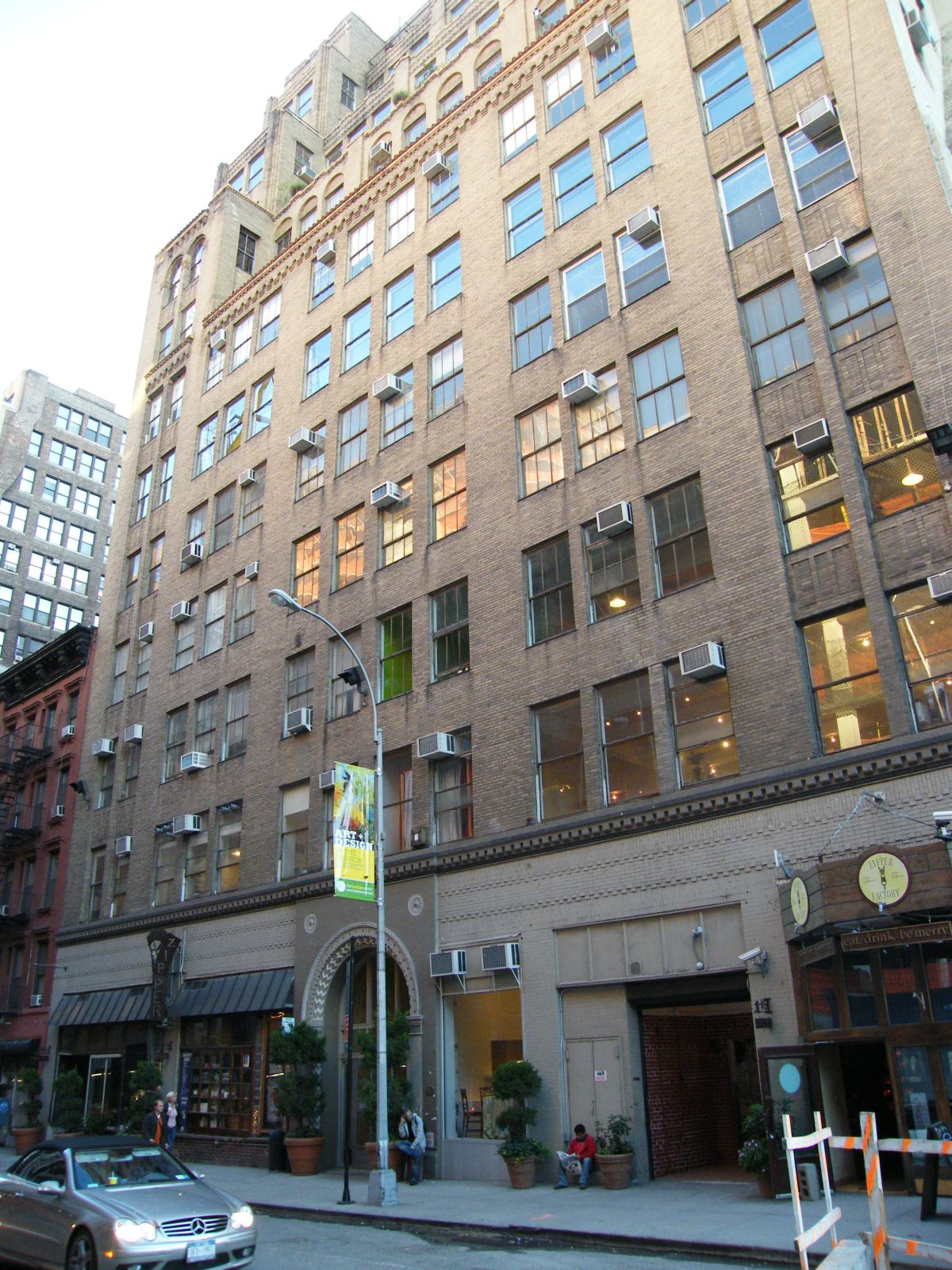
West 37th Street

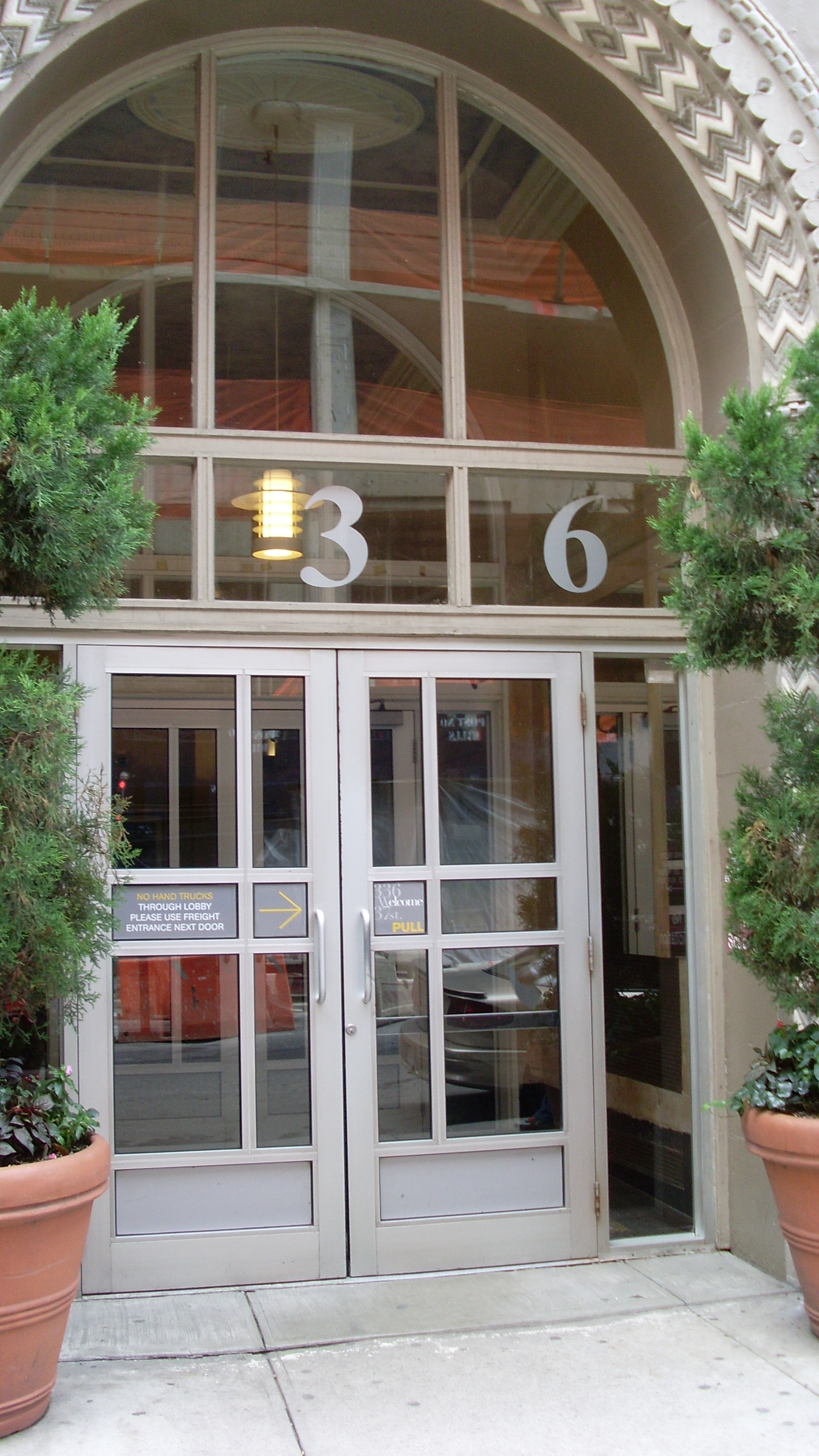
Entrance

The Camera Club of New York was founded in 1884 as a photography club. Though the Club was created by well-to-do "gentlemen" photography enthusiasts seeking a refuge from the mass popularization of the medium in the 1880s, it accepted its first woman as a member, Miss Elizabeth A. Slade, in 1887, only four years after its inception, and later came to accept new ideas and new approaches to the medium.

Over the years the Club helped launch revolutionary new approaches to photography and nurture many photographers who later became giants in the field. Alfred Stieglitz used the Club as a forum and venue to convince a still skeptical public that photography was an art worthy of comparison to painting. Later, as the medium matured, the Club was again the place where the new "straight photography" approach would emerge. Paul Strand, who joined the Camera Club at 17, was introduced to a camera at the Club that had a right-angle viewfinder, allowing one to photograph people unaware. Strand used this camera to produce some of his most memorable images on the streets of New York, including Blind Woman and Wall Street.

The Camera Club was also an important place to hear about new advances in photography. For instance, X-Ray photography was demonstrated there in 1898 and the Autochrome Lumière process, an early form of color photography, in 1909. In 1930 Willard D. Morgan first introduced the new Leica camera to Club members. Among the important lectures held at the Club were Aero Photography by Edward Steichen in 1921 and The Life and Work of Eugène Atget by Berenice Abbott in 1931. Later, Richard Avedon lectured on fashion Photography in 1949.

As of 2008, the Camera Club continues to function as an important resource for photography. The club offers classes in basic camera and darkroom skills, which help nurture and create new pioneers of photography and workspaces for established and emerging photographers. Lectures and exhibits are an important part of the club's program. Since 1999 such important photographers as Eugene Richards, Nigel Parry, Duane Michals, Oliver Weber, Andres Serrano, Eddie Adams, Ryan Foerster, and Henry Horenstein have exhibited and lectured at the club.

The Camera Club of New York is located at 154 Ludlow St New York, NY 10002.
