= Kate Groobey =

British artist (born 1979)

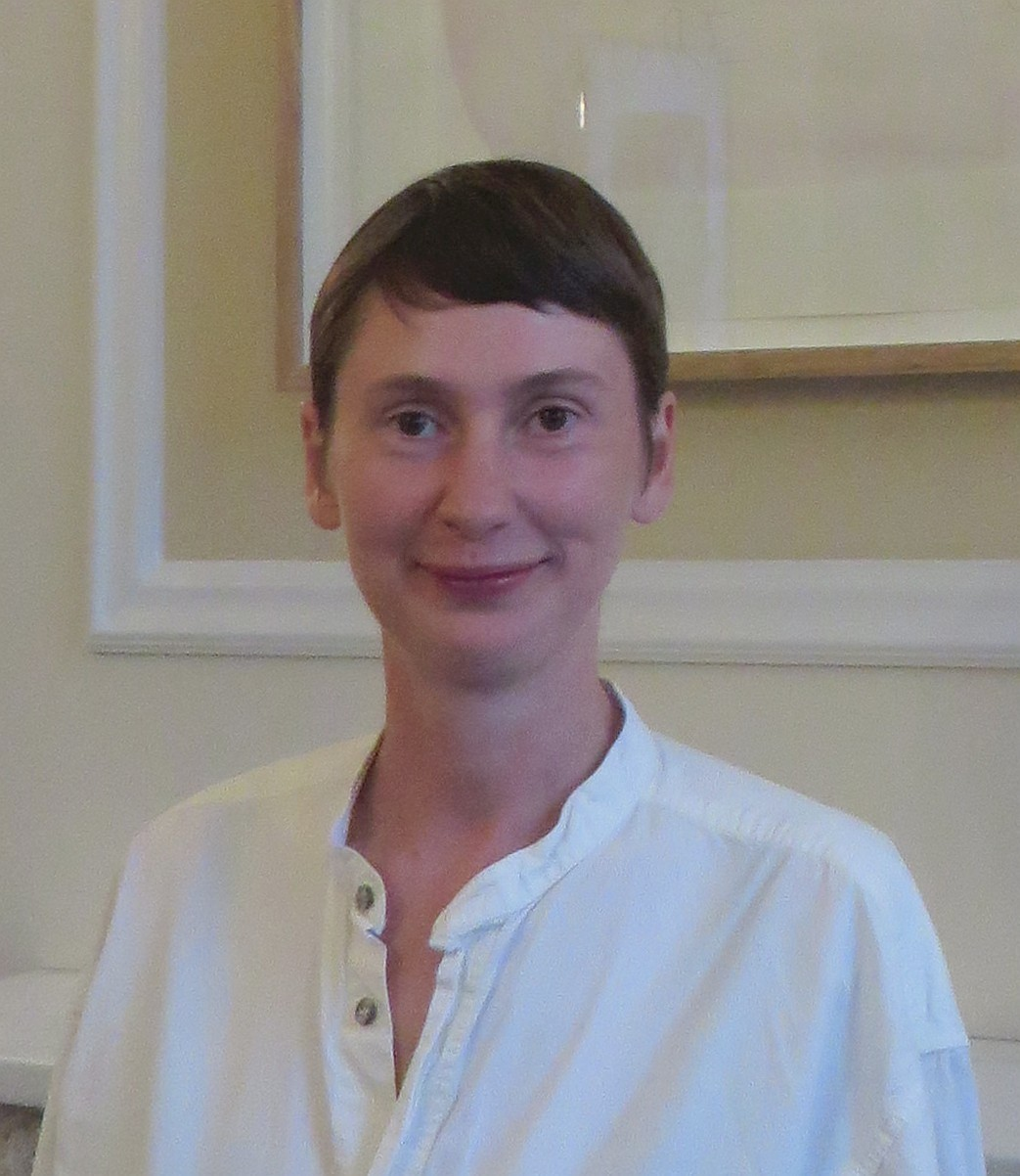
- Artist Kate Groobey
- Born: 1979; Leeds, Yorkshire, England
- Education: Ruskin School of Drawing and Fine Art (University of Oxford); Royal College of Art (London)
- Known for: Painting and performance
- Patron(s): Daiwa Anglo-Japanese Foundation, Saatchi Gallery Stanley Smith Scholarship, Royal College of Art,Daiwa Foundation Art Prize,Arts Council England.
- Website: www.kategroobey.com

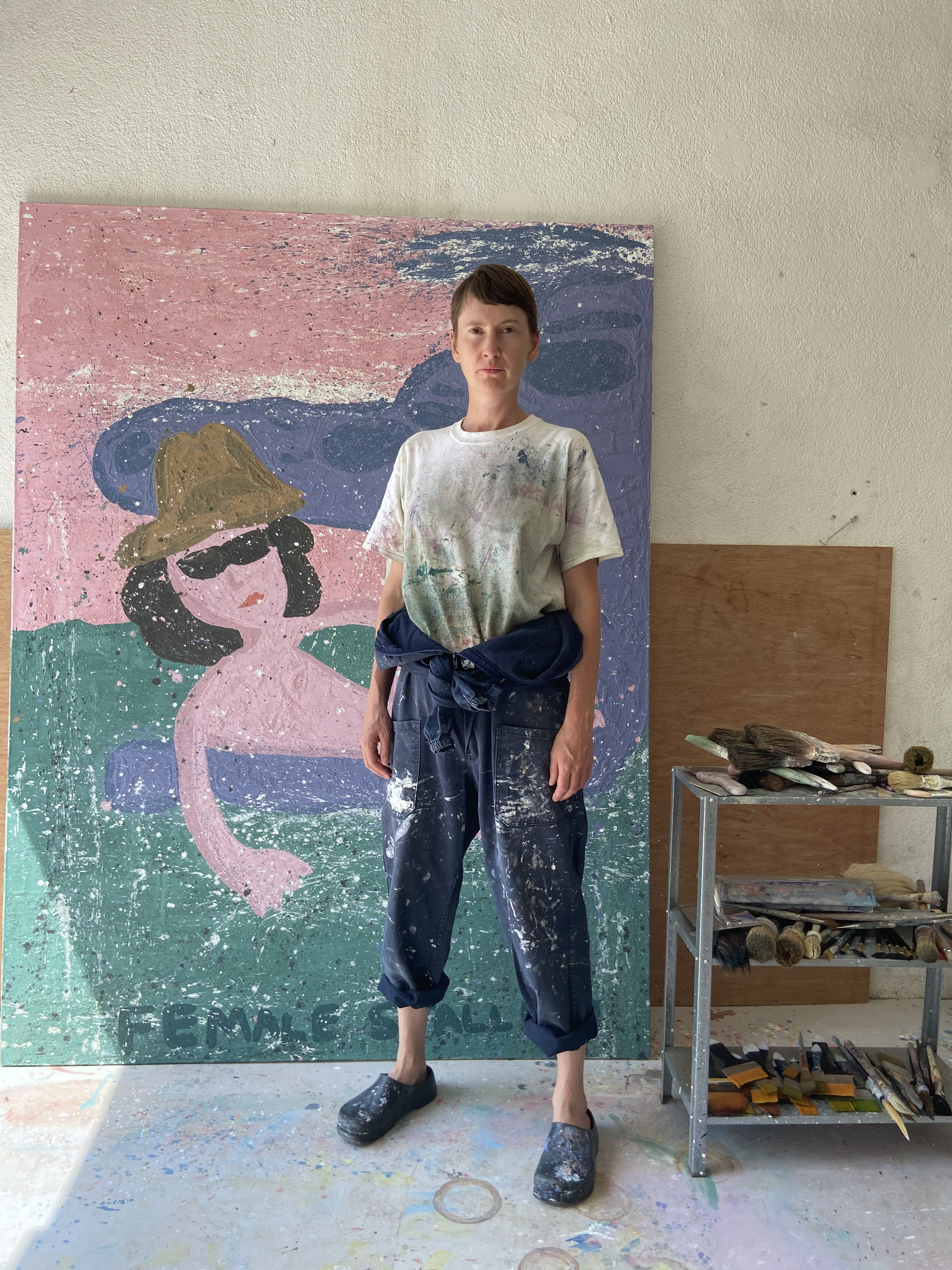
Groobey with one of her paintings 'Female Stallion' in her studio, 2022.

Kate Groobey (born 1979) is a British artist based in South Yorkshire and the South of France.

== Early life and education ==
Groobey was born in Leeds, Yorkshire. She was educated at the Ruskin School of Drawing and Fine Art, University of Oxford receiving a BFA degree in 2000. She then studied at the Royal College of Art in London, receiving an MA degree in 2010.

== Career ==
Groobey exhibited in Newspeak: British Art Now Part 2 at the Saatchi Gallery in 2010, the Bloomberg New Contemporaries 2011 at the ICA, in London and Surrreal at König Galerie, Berlin.

In 2014, Groobey was selected as one of a hundred artists for the book 100 Painters of Tomorrow.

Groobey was the first woman to win the Daiwa Foundation Art Prize in 2018.

Groobey's work has been covered in publications and essays including The Brooklyn Rail, NYC, by Alfred Mac Adam, 2017 and the Daiwa Foundation Art Prize catalogue essay by Jonathan Watkins, Ikon Gallery, 2018.

== Solo exhibitions ==
- Female Stallion, Sim Smith, London, United Kingdom (2022)
- Assholes Of Ambition, RIBOT, Milan, Italy (2019)
- Pure Pleasure, Atopos + Ikon Gallery, Venice, Italy (2019)
- Pure Pleasure, Ikon Gallery Tower Room, Birmingham, UK (2018)
- Daiwa Foundation Exhibition: Pure Pleasure, Mizuma Art Gallery, Tokyo, Japan (2018)
- I'm Made Of Milk, Horton Gallery, New York, United States (2017)
- The Good Life, Ever Gold [Projects], San Francisco, California, United States (2017)
- Perfect Potatoes, Redling Fine Art, Los Angeles, California, United States (2016)
- Perfect | Parfait, David Lynch Club Silencio, Paris, France (2015)
