= Milliken Gallery =

Art gallery in Sweden

Coordinates: 59.3424°N 18.0588°E

Milliken Gallery is a Swedish art gallery specializing in emerging and mid-career artists with an international perspective. It was opened in February 2004 by American dealer, Aldy Milliken.

Milliken Gallery selects exhibitions based on an artist or artwork's conceptual integrity and market-based qualities. It has produced solo exhibitions with Swedish artists such as Felix Gmelin, Kristina Jansson, Lars Nilsson, Tova Mozard, Matti Kallioinen, and Christine Ödlund, and foreign artists including Tris Vonna-Michell, Lisi Raskin, Olav Westphalen, and Karl Haendel.

The gallery juxtaposes solo shows with group exhibitions to introduce the Swedish public to a variety of artists often seen in Biennales and art fairs internationally. For example, Face Your Demons features internationally recognized artists Zsolt Bodoni, Mircea Cantor, Keren Cytter, Jessica Jackson Hutchins, Josiah McElheny, Goshka Macuga, Aleksandra Mir, Alyson Shotz, Magnus Wallin, and Adrian Williams.

While some exhibitions have historic value, (such as the exhibit featuring work by KP Brehmer, a contemporary to Joseph Bueys) others delve into issues surrounding the Visual Arts, exploring ideas like the relationship of Art with Craft and Design. Simple, curated by writers/artists Dr. Ronald Jones and Laurie Makela, included artists such as Andrea Zittel, Rirkrit Tiravanija, and early 20th century painter Hilma af Klint. Milliken contracts with international writers and curators to make texts for each exhibition as a way to deepen the dialogue with the public and as a response to the diminishing space given to contemporary art in the daily papers.

Director Aldy Milliken is active in other citywide cultural events. He was invited by Maria Lind to participate as a filter at the International Artists Studio Program IASPIS and has curated shows at the American Embassy in Stockholm. He is also a founding member of STHLM STHLM STHLM, a group of Stockholm art institutions that organizes local art events for international professionals.

In February 2004, the gallery opened a theater/vitamin factory in central Stockholm. It has 2 exhibition spaces totaling 150 square meters.

Its commitment to being part of an international dialogue has led it to work with museums and state collections in the Nordic region, Europe, and the United States.

The gallery closed in 2011, when Aldy Milliken accepted a position at the Kentucky Museum of Art and Craft.

== See also ==
- List of museums in Stockholm
