= Ryan Foerster =

Canadian visual artist (born 1983)

Ryan Foerster (born 1983) is a Canadian visual artist recognized for his ‘zines, photographs, videos, and sculptural installations which frequently incorporate found objects, salvaged materials, and natural elements. The artist’s reuse of discarded materials to create new artworks is a generative process of discovery and transformation integral to Foerster’s practice as well as a reaction to excessive waste.

Foerster’s work has been exhibited in museums and galleries internationally. He is also the founder of RATSTAR press.

== Early work ==
=== 'Zines ===
Foerster started creating ‘zines while he was in high school. Using the copy machine at his father’s office, Foerster and his friends printed Dear Henry Wang, a ‘zine composed of “random writing, stuff [they] found in dumpsters, photos, jokes, and interviews with punk bands from around Toronto.” Issues were available in Toronto's cooperative-run store Who's Emma? where punk bands played in the basement. The ‘zine offered Foerster an opportunity to “get involved, voice ideas, and meet people” and provided Foerster's introduction to photography, as he photographed and interviewed many of the bands in the Toronto punk scene in the late 1990s.

Foerster moved to New York in 2005 to attend the International Center of Photography, but dropped out after three months. Traditional photographic processes were not of interest to Foerster who has stated, “Photography with insane production value really grossed me out. I didn’t want to need thousands of dollars to make art. It was more satisfying to make art out of nothing, out of things other people didn’t want.” However, a course Foerster took at the ICP on photography and sculpture taught by the artist Sam Samore did have an influence on Foerster's interest in mixing photography with “found-object books and sculptures.” In an interview with Bomb magazine Foerster notes, “The first shows I did in my apartment in Brooklyn were a mix of photos I took and sculptures I’d made from shit on the street. It’s funny that I’m basically doing the same thing ten years later.” In 2008 Foerster presented his photographs and sculpture in a solo exhibition at Swiss institute, New York, for which he also printed a ‘zine.

=== Early photographs ===
Foerster’s early photographs from this period are largely diaristic: observations from daily life, natural phenomena, and photos of his friends and travels. His images were featured in VICE magazine and on the artist Tim Barber’s website tinyvices, an online showcase for emerging photographers, as well as in an exhibition at White Columns, New York in 2007.

=== Val Kilmer ===
Between 2004-06 Foerster, along with others, graffitied the name ‘Val Kilmer’ and pasted a black-and-white image of the actor's head on buildings, doorways, and other locations in the streets of Toronto and New York. Speculation regarding the inspiration for the graffiti and its auteur was covered by the New York Post, Gawker, and other outlets in the U.S. and Canada. Foerster also made a ‘zine featuring the image.

== Later work ==
=== Alternative processes, photograms ===
The artist Allen Frame suggested Foerster get a membership at the Camera Club of New York, the historic co-operative dark room whose past members include Alfred Stieglitz, Richard Avedon, Edward Steichen, Paul Strand, and Berenice Abbott. Foerster couldn’t afford the membership fee to use the labs and darkrooms, so he got a job doing maintenance on the club’s color processor. Not having the money for expensive photographic materials, Foerster began using discarded photographic paper he found in the darkrooms, including the sheets of photo paper he used to clean the color processors. “People would discard faulty materials around the building—photo paper with chemicals spilled across it, expired film.” Foerster would use them to print his own photographs. By using these “faulty” salvaged materials, Foerster allowed an element of chance to dictate the outcome of his photographs. From these experimental works, Foerster had a further realization. He recounts, “[One day] there was a stack of [prints] and they were blowing. So I put, like, a beer can or a coffee cup or something on them. And the condensation underneath it lifted up the emulsion and made it corrode.” Inspired by this chance accident, Foerster began “to experiment with photosensitive paper, exposing it to the elements—rain, heat, bird shit—weighting the paper with rocks and earth to hold it in place, which then became an encrusted layer over the image.” These photograms revealed the uncontrollable influence of nature on his materials, and were an inflection point in the artist's process moving him away from his earlier style of image-making further toward a non-purist approach to the medium.

In 2012 Hurricane Sandy caused flooding in Foerster's Brighton Beach home. The water damage affected boxes of Foerster's early photographs. Rather than discard the prints, he chose to present them as new works, relishing the changed and bleeding colors, staining, and buckling. He states, “At first I thought about them as ruined, but now I’m not sure that’s what really happened. It’s just one way of looking at it.”

=== Found objects, sculptural assemblages, and installations ===
During the 2008 financial crisis, when Foerster's day job assisting artists was tenuous and he had limited resources but more time, he would walk around his neighborhood observing and collecting. He notes,

"I would walk around a lot since I was in a weird transitional period, not photographing and feeling depressed. I would find stuff on these walks that I thought was interesting enough to bring home. I mostly picked up scrap metal and wood. I played with seeing these objects on my walls and adding the photos I had at home. It seemed right. It was closer to my actual train of thought and how I interacted with things...It all added different layers to how I understood seeing and remembering things."

Foerster transforms the discarded objects and natural elements which he collects into sculptural assemblages, integrating them into his installations, presenting these individual objects and arrangements in congress with his photo-based artworks, paintings, drawings, and videos. In his installations Foerster has incorporated mining slag residue from mines in Ontario, the salvaged ink-stained metal printing plates used to print his ‘zines, wooden benches he made with his grandfather, and sundry items the artist finds on the streets of New York or on the beach near his home in Brighton Beach, Brooklyn.

Foerster has noted he is particularly interested in the “in-between stage when something still exists but it no longer functions the way it was intended to." He has stated, "I think composting is a really good metaphor for my work—the entire cycle where old work generates new work—it’s the in-between stage where discarded food gets turned into a rich soil again to grow more food." The artist's process is propelled by his interest in creating “something from nothing”. He has remarked, “I was sick of waste and all this excess shit that was here.”

== Exhibitions and awards ==
Foerster's work has been exhibited at the Abrons Art Center, New York; Swiss Institute, New York; White Columns, New York; Baxter St at the Camera Club of New York; Pioneer Works, New York; The Museum of Fine Arts, Split; Columbus Museum of Art; Aspen Art Museum; and the Museum of Contemporary Canadian Art, Toronto. Foerster's work was also included in “Rockaway!” organized by MOMA PS1, Rockaway Beach Surf Club, New York 2014. ‘Zines by Foerster were included in the Museum of Modern Art Library exhibition “Millennium Magazines”, 2012. Foerster has shown at Clearing Gallery; Ribordy Thetaz Gallery; Martos Gallery; Kerry Schuss Gallery; Cooper Cole Gallery; The National Exemplar; and Hannah Hoffman Gallery. Foerster's books and 'zines are in the collections of the New York Public Library, Yale University Library, and the Museum of Modern Art library.

In 2011 Foerster curated the exhibition “Harvest Moon” featuring works by his artist friends including Elaine Cameron-Weir, Erik Lindman, Hunter Hunt-Hendrix, Jacob Kassay and others. Mirroring Foerster's own process of subjecting artworks to the elements, and his democratic approach to installing works in various media, Foerster placed the artworks in the backyard and other areas around his Brighton Beach home which was formerly owned by the artist Silvianna Goldsmith.

In 2014 Foerster curated the exhibition “Silvianna Goldsmith” at White Columns, NY 2014. He has also curated exhibitions at ribordy contemporary, Geneva 2014, and Martos Gallery, New York, 2014.

Foerster was the recipient of the Artadia NADA award in 2013 and received a Pollock Krasner foundation grant in 2012.

== Personal life ==
Ryan Foerster was born in 1983 in Newmarket Canada. He lives in Brighton Beach, Brooklyn New York.
