= Police Museum (Stockholm) =

Museum in Stockholm, Sweden

Coordinates: 59.3331°N 18.1185°E

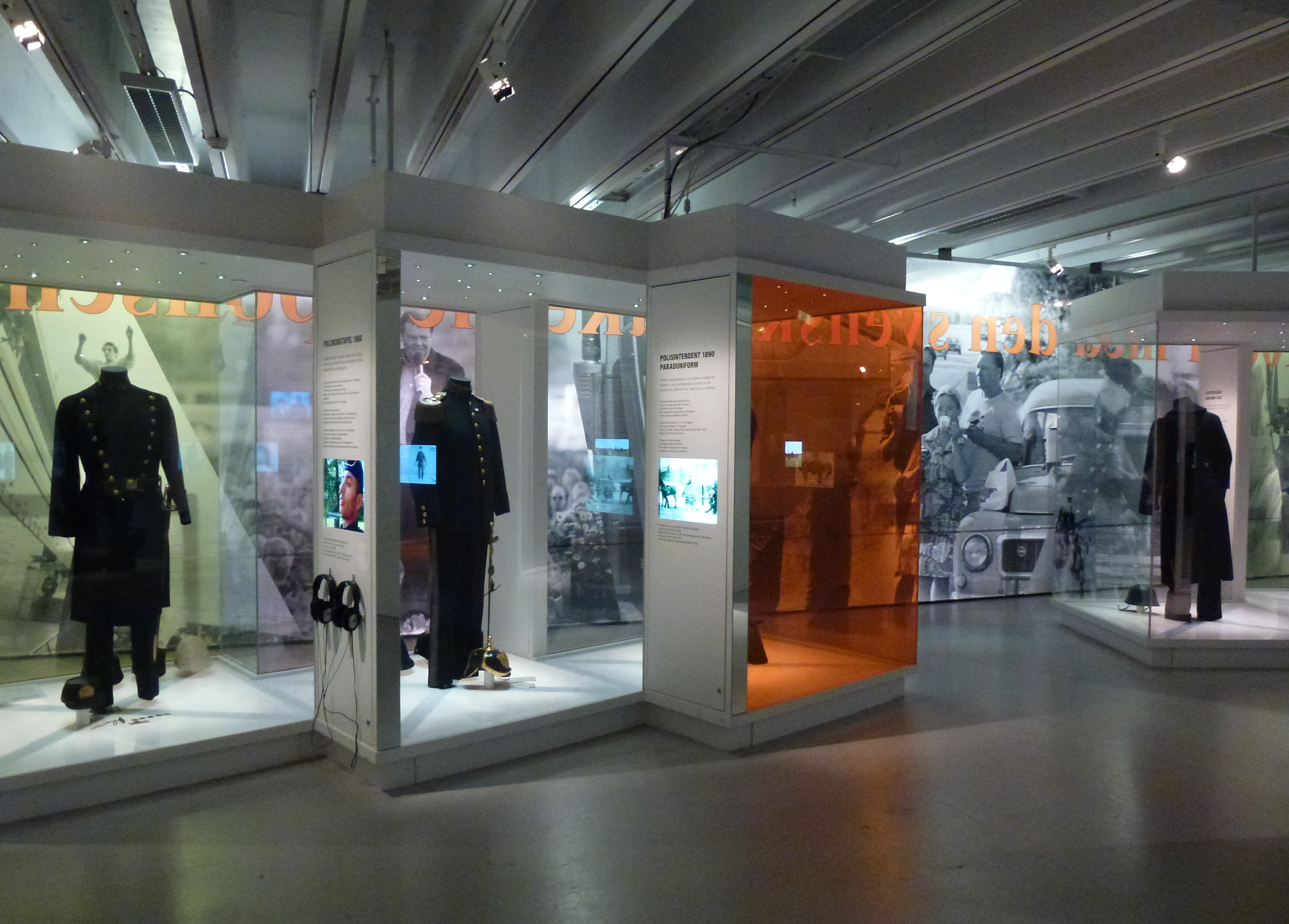
Uniform display at the museum

The Police Museum (Polismuseet) is a policing museum in Stockholm, Sweden, run by and telling the history of the Swedish Police. It has existed in its present form since 2007.
