= Jason James (director) =

British director and Japan expert

Jason Charles James OBE
- Born: 1965 (age 60–61)
- Education: Marlborough College; King's College, Cambridge
- Occupation: Director General
- Employer(s): HSBC; British Council; Daiwa
- Organization(s): Japan–British Society; Daiwa Anglo-Japanese Foundation; The Japan Society of the UK
- Known for: UK/Japan relations

Jason James OBE (born 1965) is a British director and expert on United Kingdom/Japan relations.

== Education ==
James was educated at King's College School, Cambridge (1973–78) and Marlborough College (1978–82). James then studied at King's College, Cambridge (1983–87), where he was an academic and choral scholar, and received a 1st-class degree with distinction in Japanese Studies.

== Career ==
After his studies, James worked in the financial industry, specialising in Japanese equities. He became Head of Research in the HSBC Securities Tokyo office, and later Head of Global Equity Strategy at HSBC in London. In 1998, he was interviewed as head of equity research at James Capel (part of HSBC) in Tokyo. In 1999, he co-authored the book The Political Economy of Japanese Financial Markets: Myth versus Reality with Dick Beason, published by St. Martin's Press.

From 2007 to 2011, James was Director of the British Council in Tokyo, Japan. During this time he was also Chair of the European Union National Institutes of Culture Japan cluster, a board member of the Japan–British Society, and a board member of United World Colleges Japan. Since 2011, he has been the Director General at the London-based Daiwa Anglo-Japanese Foundation. While in London, has also been a Trustee of the Japan Society, and a member of the Japan Season of Culture Action Committee, a member of the UK-Japan 21st Century Group, and a Governor of King's College School, Cambridge. In 2025, he became Chair of the Joseph Levy Foundation Board of Trustees.

== Recognition ==
James was awarded an OBE in 2023 for services to United Kingdom/Japan relations.
