= Daiwa Anglo-Japanese Foundation =

UK charitable organization

- 大和日英基金
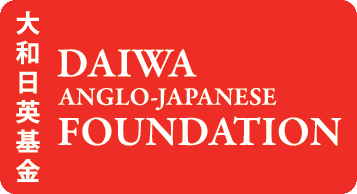
- Formation: 1988
- Founder: Yoshitoki Chino
- Headquarters: Daiwa Foundation Japan House, Marylebone, London
- Key people: Jason James (Director General); Sir Tim Hitchens (Chairman); Takashi Hibino (Vice Chairman)
- Website: dajf.org.uk
- Remarks: Charity supporting closer links between Britain and Japan.

The Daiwa Anglo-Japanese Foundation (Japanese: 大和日英基金) is a United Kingdom-based charity (registered no. 299955) established in 1988 to support closer links between Britain and Japan. It was founded with a benefaction from Daiwa Securities Co Ltd (now known as Daiwa Capital Markets, the investment banking arm of Japan's second largest brokerage Daiwa Securities Group).

== Activities ==
The Foundation carries out its objective through the following activities:

- Making grants available to individuals, institutions, and organisations to promote links between the UK and Japan in all fields of activity
- Awarding scholarships to young British graduates to study Japan and its language
- Organising a year-round programme of events to increase understanding of Japan in the UK

== Location ==
The Foundation is based at Daiwa Foundation Japan House, a Georgian town house designed by Decimus Burton overlooking Regent's Park in central London. Daiwa Foundation Japan House acts as a centre for UK-Japan relations in Britain by offering a programme of seminars, exhibitions and book launches as well as meeting rooms for Japan-related activities.

Part of Daiwa Foundation Japan House, 13 Cornwall Terrace, was the home of Sir Arthur Lasenby Liberty (1843–1917), founder of Liberty & Co.

The Foundation is represented in Japan by its Tokyo Office, which provides local assistance to Daiwa Scholars and administers grant applications from Japan. It also handles general enquiries about the Foundation's programmes.

== Daiwa Scholarships ==
=== Daiwa Scholarships ===
The Daiwa Scholarship is an educational programme that sends British graduates to Japan for 19 months. Daiwa Scholars spend 1 month studying Japanese in the UK, 12 months studying Japanese in Japan, 1 month on a homestay and 6 months on a work placement. Up to 8 Daiwa Scholarships are available each year.

The programme was established in 1991 and was inspired by the belief that the exchange of young people would foster mutual understanding and support the long-term relationship between Britain and Japan.

It is a core programme of the Foundation, and through it, the Foundation seeks to identify future leaders in their fields who will derive personal and professional benefit from obtaining an in-depth experience of Japan.

Since 1991, 190 graduates from over 50 universities and over 60 different subject areas have completed the programme.

=== Notable Daiwa Scholarship alumni ===
- Edmund de Waal OBE (Ceramicist/Author)
- Professor Hugo Dobson (Author/Head of East Asian Studies at Sheffield University)
- James Harding (journalist) (Co-founder & Editor of Tortoise Media, former Head of BBC News and Editor of The Times)
- Carl Randall (Artist)
- Christopher Harding (Cultural Historian)

=== Daiwa Scholarships in Japanese Studies ===
The Daiwa Scholarships in Japanese Studies is a programme established in April 2015 to fund postgraduate students of Japanese Studies on courses in either Japan or the UK. Applicants must be British citizens who are holders of a degree in Japanese Studies, defined as a course focusing primarily on the study of Japan and containing a substantial Japanese language component, and who are enrolled or enrolling in a Japanese Studies-related course in either Japan or the UK.

== Grants ==
The Foundation provides funding through the following programmes:

=== Daiwa Foundation Small Grants ===
Daiwa Foundation Small Grants are available from £2,000–9,000 to individuals, societies, associations or other bodies in the UK or Japan to promote and support interaction between the two countries. They can cover all fields of activity, including educational and grassroots exchanges, research travel, the organisation of conferences, exhibitions, and other projects and events that fulfil this broad objective. New initiatives are especially encouraged.

=== Daiwa Foundation Awards ===
Daiwa Foundation Awards are available from £9,000–18,000 for collaborative projects that enable British and Japanese partners to work together, preferably within the context of an institutional relationship. Projects in academic, scientific, professional, cultural, and educational fields are eligible.

=== Daiwa Adrian Prizes ===
Every three years until 2016, the Foundation made prizes available in recognition of significant scientific collaboration between Japanese and British research teams. The Daiwa Adrian Prizes have since been discontinued.

=== Daiwa Foundation Art Prize ===
The Daiwa Foundation Art Prize was a triennial prize open to British artists resident in the United Kingdom who had not previously had a solo exhibition in Japan. In addition to an exhibition in Japan, the winning artist was given a period of support and introductions to key individuals and organisations in the Japanese contemporary art world. The winning artist was also awarded a participation fee of £5,000. Recent winners are Marcus Coates (2009), Haroon Mirza (2012), Oliver Beer (2015), and Kate Groobey (2018). The Daiwa Foundation Art Prize was discontinued after the last winner in 2018.

== Events ==
The Foundation has an ongoing programme of UK-Japan events based mainly at Daiwa Foundation Japan House in London. Since 2020, events have also been hosted as online webinars.

=== Seminars ===
The Foundation organises an annual series of evening seminars based on a broad contemporary theme. Seminars draw on the experience and expertise of British and Japanese contributors to explore topics of mutual relevance and to stimulate debate amongst decision-makers.

Themes have included:

- RETHINK (2021)
- Beyond Coronavirus (2020)
- A Year of Transitions (2019)
- New Approaches in the UK and Japan (2018)
- Japan and the UK: A focus on History (2017)
- Finding a Balance: Japan and the UK (2016)
- Diversity in Japan and the UK (2015)
- Power: An Essential Feature in Relationships (2014)
- The Search for Contentment: Shifting Values in the UK and Japan (2013)
- Leadership: People and Power in the UK and Japan (2012)
- Uncertain Futures: The Individual, Society and the State in the UK and Japan (2011)
- States in Change: National Identity in the UK and Japan (2010)
- Changing World Views: International Challenges for the UK and Japan (2009)
- Economic Futures: Wealth and Well Being in the UK and Japan (2008)
- Running the Country: People and Politics in the UK and Japan (2007)
- Life's Chances: demographic change in the UK and Japan (2006)
- The Arts, Culture and Society in the UK and Japan (2005)
- UK-Japan Cities of the Future: Regeneration and Urban Life (2004)
- Education and Society (2003)
- Japan's International Relations (2002)

=== Exhibitions ===
The gallery at Daiwa Foundation Japan House displays works by contemporary Japanese artists and formerly British artists influenced by Japan. All exhibitions are free of charge. Notable artists to have exhibited at Daiwa Foundation Japan House include Setsuko Ono, sister of Yoko Ono.

=== Book launches ===
The book launch series brings together experts to discuss new publications in the field of Japanese studies.

=== Voluntary groups ===
Daiwa Foundation Japan House provides space for voluntary groups with connections to Japan. Users of the meeting rooms and other facilities have included Asia-Pacific Technology Network; British Association for Japanese Studies; The Japan Foundation Endowment Committee; Sakura-kai, Japanese language classes; Hosei University; The Japan Society Art Circle; International Children's Bunko Association; Japanese Women's Association; Urasenke Foundation; and flower arranging groups.

== See also ==
- List of European art awards
- Anglo-Japanese relations
