= Swedish Museum of Performing Arts =

Museum in Stockholm, Sweden

Coordinates: 59.33351°N 18.07820°E

- Scenkonstmuseet
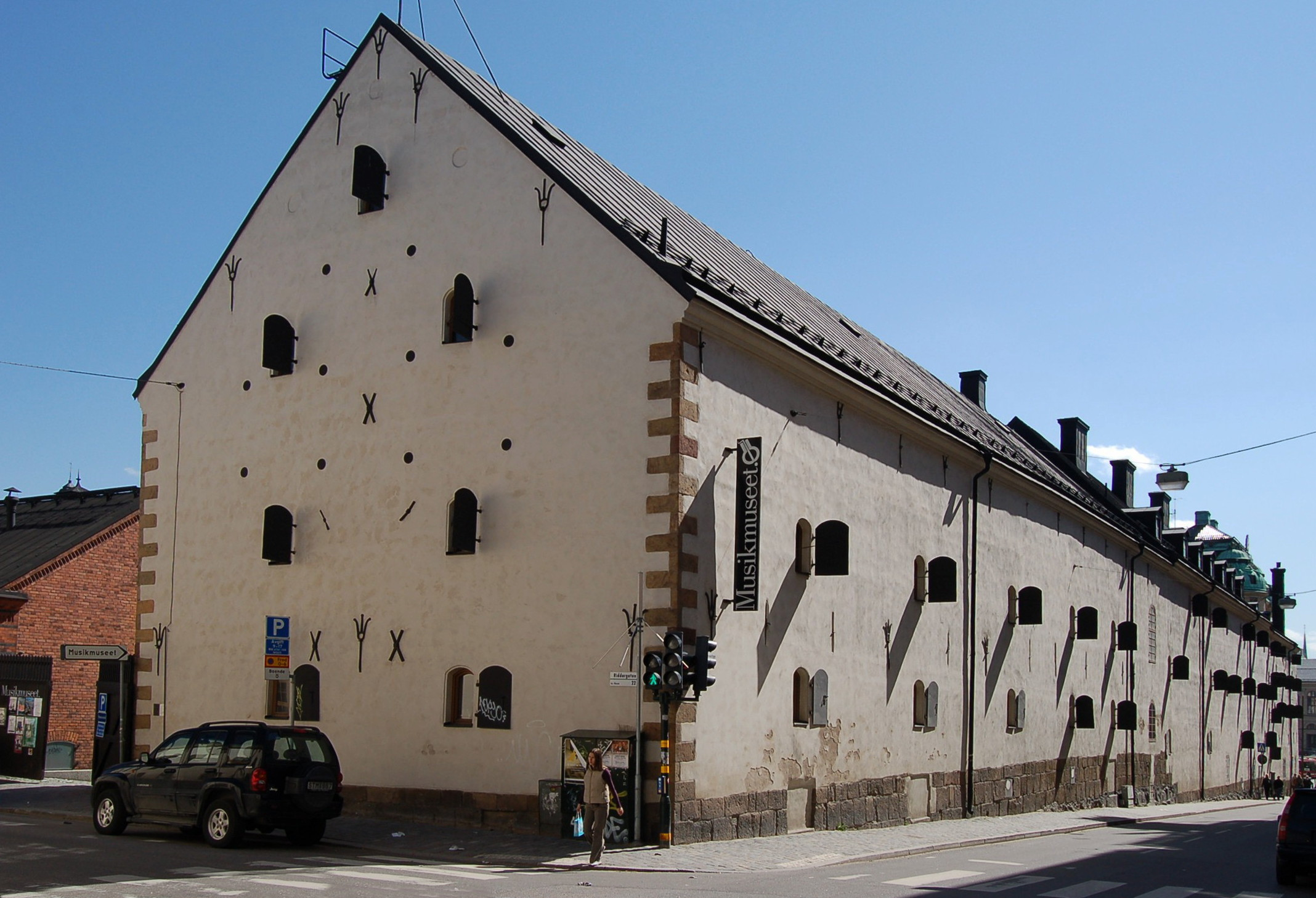

- Location within Stockholm
- Former name: Music and Theater Museum
- Established: 2010
- Location: Stockholm, Sweden
- Website: scenkonstmuseet.se

The Swedish Museum of Performing Arts (Swedish: Scenkonstmuseet), from 2010 to 2014 known as the Music and Theater Museum, is a museum in Stockholm, Sweden. The museum is dedicated to dance, music and theatre.

== Collection and activities ==
The museum presents a storyline rather than following a chronological order. There is a collection of 60,000 objects, including stage designs, hand written song texts and premiere pieces. There are at least 6,000 musical instruments as well as puppets, marionettes and costumes. Since its reopening in 2017 the museum has a broad emphasis on interactive activities: for example there is a gestrument, an aggregation between gesture and instrument – visitors can make music by moving their bodies."

== History ==
The museum was founded in 2010 as the Music and Theater Museum. It closed on 30 March 2014 then reopened on 11 February 2017 with the new name Swedish Museum of Performing Arts (in English, Swedish: Scenkonstmuseet).

The museum originated in a merger of the Music Museum, Theater Museum and Puppet Museum:

Musikhistoriska museet (1901–1981); Musikmuseet (1981–2010)	Drottningholms teatermuseum (1921–1998); Sveriges Teatermuseum (1998–2009)	Marionettmuseet (1973–2009)
	Musik- och teatermuseet (2010–2014); Scenkonstmuseet; Museum of Performing Arts (2017-today)

== See also ==
- List of music museums
