= Stockholm County Museum =

Museum in Sweden

Coordinates: 59°18′18″N 18°07′12″E

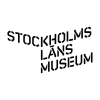
Stockholms läns museum logotype

Stockholm County Museum (Swedish: Stockholms läns museum) is the regional museum of Stockholm County, Sweden.

Stockholm County Museum is a fully digital museum dedicated to culture heritage, sites of interest, and the county's public art.

The museum actively collects digital photographs from the county residents through its "samtidsbild" ("contemporary image") initiative. This includes its attempt to collect memes.

Since 2021, the county museum has been administered by Region Stockholm.

== See also ==
- History of Stockholm
- Stockholm City Museum
