= Redling Fine Art =

Contemporary art gallery in Los Angeles, California

Coordinates: 34.101071°N 118.243567°W

Redling Fine Art is a contemporary art gallery in Los Angeles, California, United States.

== History ==
The gallery was founded by Erica Redling in 2007. Redling Fine Art represents a small group of emerging artists with conceptually concise exhibitions. Redling Fine Art has been cited by Bettina Korek, founder of For Your Art for representing L.A.’s next generation at art fairs like Art Basel and Frieze Art Fair. Originally based in Chinatown, the gallery moved to Hollywood in 2011. Since 2019, Redling Fine Art has relocated to the Frogtown neighborhood of Los Angeles.

Occupying a location in Hollywood near galleries like Regen Projects, Kohn Gallery, Hannah Hoffman Gallery, Galvak Gallery and non-profit organization Los Angeles Nomadic Division (LAND), the space is "quintessential L.A.," Redling says, situated in, "an old prop warehouse whose front was sliced off to make a strip mall."

== Artists ==
Redling Fine Art represents Dawn Kasper, Jason Kraus, Erlea Maneros Zabala, Martin Kersels, Tony Oursler and Brian O'Connell.

== Press ==
Solo and group exhibitions mounted at Redling Fine Art have received critical attention in the Los Angeles Times and LA Weekly as well as art-focused publications such as Notes on Looking, Artforum magazine, and Artillery magazine.
