= Strandvägen =

Street in Östermalm, Stockholm, Sweden

Coordinates: 59°19′54″N 18°05′18″E

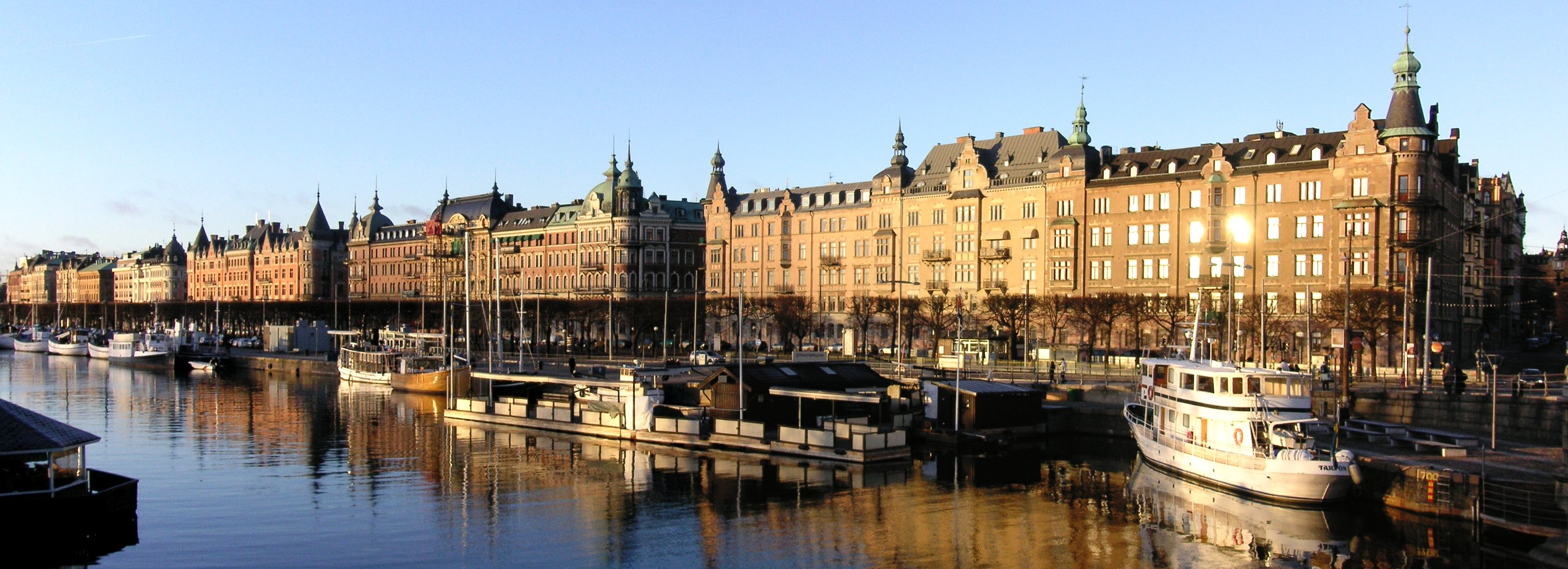
Panoramic view of Strandvägen from Djurgårdsbron.

Strandvägen (Swedish pronunciation: [ˈstrânːdˌvɛːɡɛn]) is a street on Östermalm in central Stockholm, Sweden. Completed just in time for the Stockholm World's Fair 1897, it quickly became known as one of the most prestigious addresses in town.

Stretching 1 km (3.500 ft) east from Nybroplan, Strandvägen is intercepted by (west to east) Arsenalsgatan, Nybrogatan, Sibyllegatan, Artillerigatan, Skeppargatan, Grevgatan, Styrmansgatan, Grev Magnigatan, Torstenssonsgatan, Banérgatan, Narvavägen, Djurgårdsbron, Storgatan, Ulrikagatan, and Oxenstiernsgatan. It has four parallel streets: Almlöfsgatan, Väpnargatan, Kaptensgatan, and Riddargatan. Hamngatan forms a continuation in its western end, as do Djurgårdsbrunnsvägen in its eastern end.

The Djurgården heritage tramway passes over Strandvägen. The waters south of the street are named Nybroviken, Ladugårdslandsviken, and Djurgårdsbrunnsviken.

== History ==
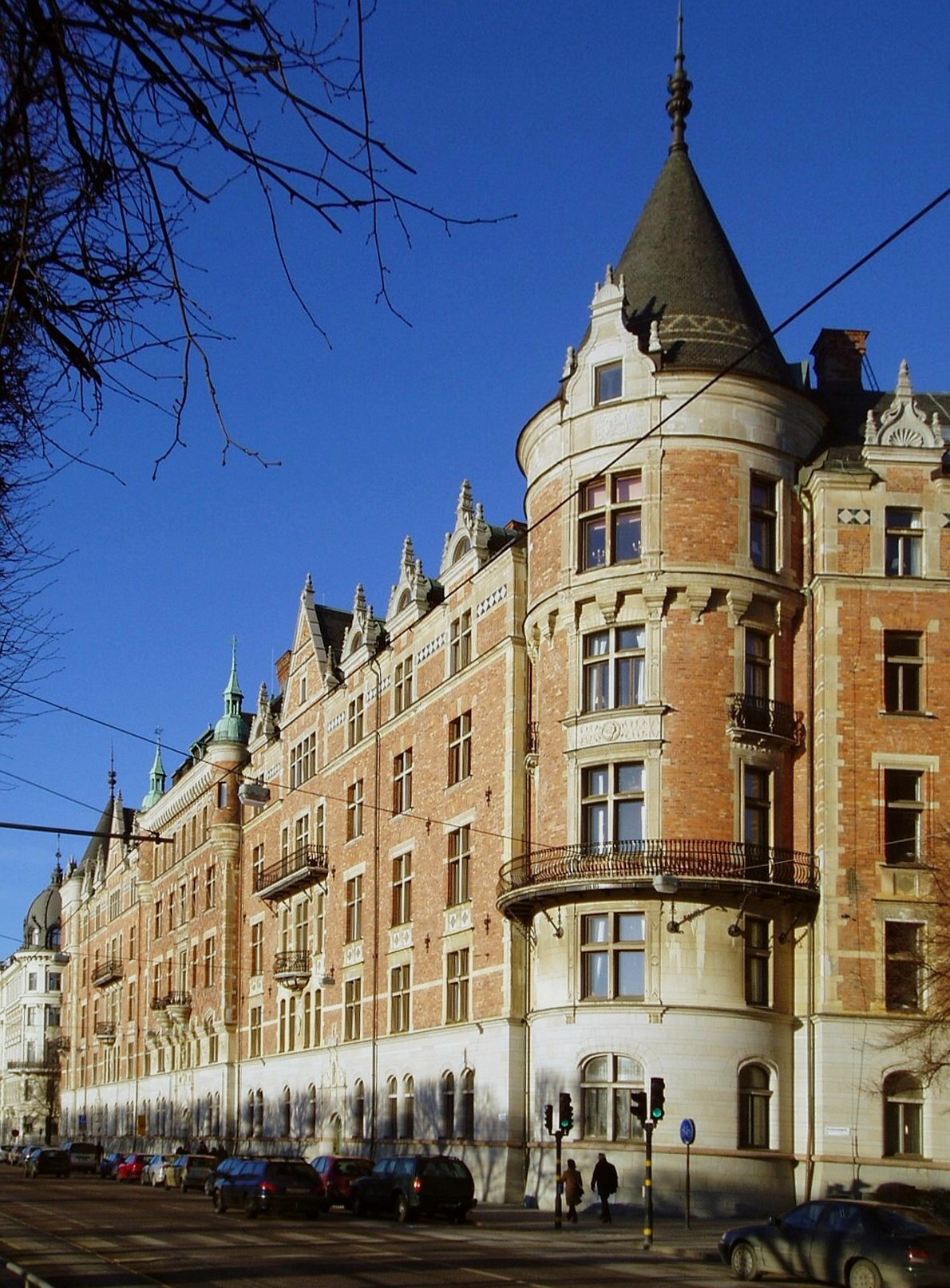
Bünsow House

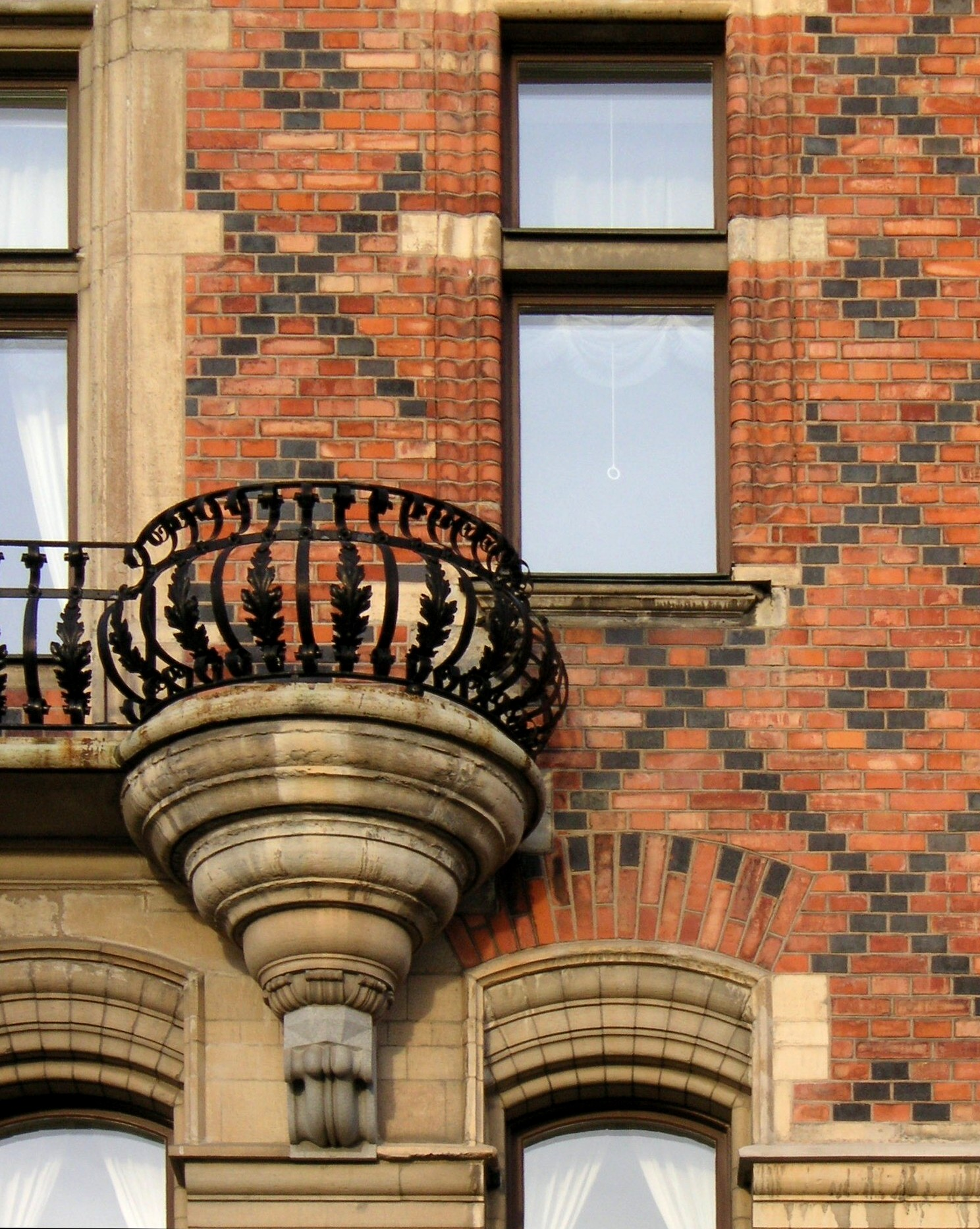
Detail of the elaborate brick patterns of Bünsow House.

The street is first mentioned as Ladugårdslands Strandgata and Strandvägen respectively in 1885. However, an outstanding quay along the present waterfront was first discussed in 1857, and within two years a proposal was produced for a combined harbour and an esplanade planted with trees — "a street unparalleled in Europe". Works were started in 1862, but by the mid-1870s walking along the water front was still practicable at best, as the area was still crowded with sheds and hovels. The first trees along the 79 m wide street were planted in 1879, and while construction work on the buildings along the street was started in the 1880s, 75% of the 24 buildings were built in the 1890s. However, in front of the World's Fair in 1897, the street was trafficable for both pedestrians and vehicles.

Bünsow House (Bünsowska huset) on number 29–33 constructed in 1886–88, set a standard, not only for the entire street but for architecture in Sweden during the 1890s. It is named after Friedrich Bünsow, who made a fortune on wood and also embellished central Sundsvall with the same kind of luxurious architecture. His architectural contest for the site at Strandvägen was won by the young architect Isak Gustaf Clason who during the contest was studying Renaissance architecture in the Loire Valley. From there he imported the towers, the dormers, and the "honest materials" (i.e. exposed bricks instead of plaster which dominated Swedish architecture during the preceding decades). In his 1895 novel Förvillelser, author Hjalmar Söderberg described the building as "a defiant and brilliant knight's poem in stone".

Even though Bünsow House set the standard for the street, it was an exception in that it was commissioned by one of the prospected residents. The builders of the remaining buildings on Strandvägen were well aware of the value of the prestigious location, and therefore commissioned some of the best architects of the era to design both the façades and the 5–10 room apartments to appeal to their exclusive audience. From the beginning, the rental cost for most of the apartments behind the prestigious façades exceeded average salaries. The smaller apartments on the backyards, however, were intended for low-income earners.

Since 2005 works to develop Strandvägen into a more attractive area for both pedestrians and ships have been progressing: Footways are being paved in granite and lampposts, benches, and litter bins are given a uniform design, while parked cars are confined to available underground carparks.

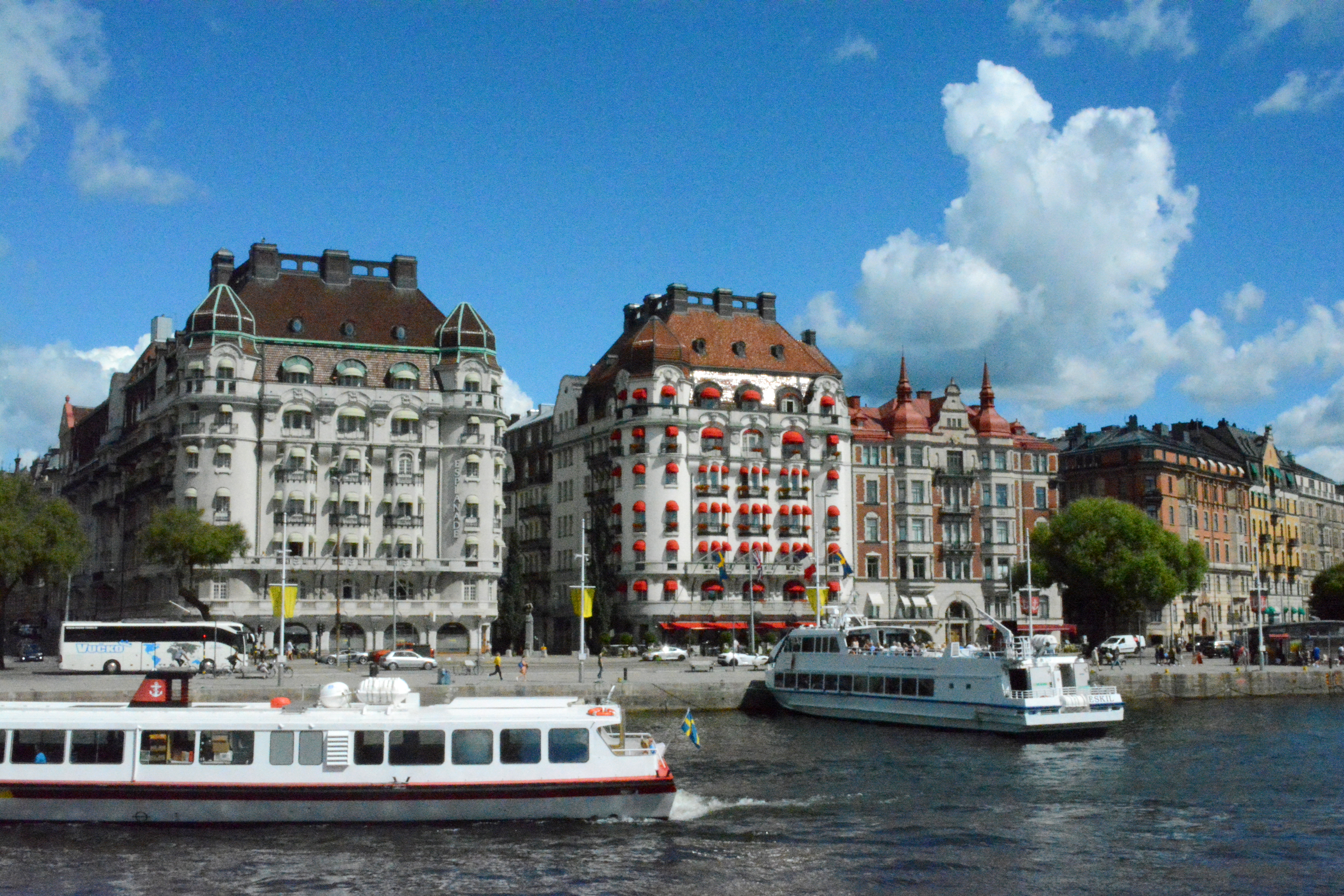
Panoramic view of Strandvägen from Blasieholmen.

== See also ==
- Geography of Stockholm
- Diplomatstaden
