= Rose & Born =

Swedish clothing company

- Type: Private
- Industry: Fashion; Menswear
- Founded: 1989; 37 years ago in Stockholm, Sweden
- Headquarters: Stockholm, Sweden
- Number of locations: 2 stores (Stockholm; Zürich)
- Products: Ready-to-wear menswear, Made-to-measure tailoring, shirts, knitwear, outerwear, accessories
- Services: Made-to-measure consultations, tailoring and alterations, wedding services
- Website: roseborn.com

Rose & Born is a Swedish menswear company founded in 1989 in Stockholm. The company sells ready-to-wear menswear and operates a made-to-measure program. Rose & Born operates stores in Stockholm and Zürich and sells internationally via e-commerce and appointment-based trunk shows.

== History ==
=== Early development ===
A 2001 profile in Dagens industri described Rose & Born's retail environment at Strandvägen in Stockholm as resembling a gentlemen's club and noted hospitality during fittings as part of the store experience. The article also described the development of an in-house collection through direct work with Italian clothing factories and the use of direct marketing to customers, including a client register and editorial mailings. Dagens industri reported a turnover of 15 million SEK for the year 2000 and noted that tailoring categories such as suits and blazers represented a large share of sales at the time.

In a separate 2001 Dagens industri article discussing workplace dress codes during an economic slowdown, the company's founder was quoted on the role of conservative norms in corporate dress, particularly in finance, and the return of classic combinations such as dark suits and ties.

=== Editorial presence and later expansion ===
International menswear publications in the 2010s covered Rose & Born as part of Stockholm's menswear retail and tailoring landscape and discussed the company's online presence. In 2015, Permanent Style listed Rose & Born among Stockholm menswear destinations in a sartorial shopping guide.

In October 2024, trade publication Habit reported that Rose & Born expanded its Stockholm premises by adding a made-to-measure studio of approximately 120 square metres dedicated to made-to-order garments across categories including shirts, jeans, jackets, suits and coats. In 2025, Odalisque Magazine reported that Rose & Born had opened a store in Zürich.
