= Torstenssonsgatan =

Street in Östermalm, Stockholm, Sweden

Coordinates: 59°19′55.2″N 18°05′18.7″E

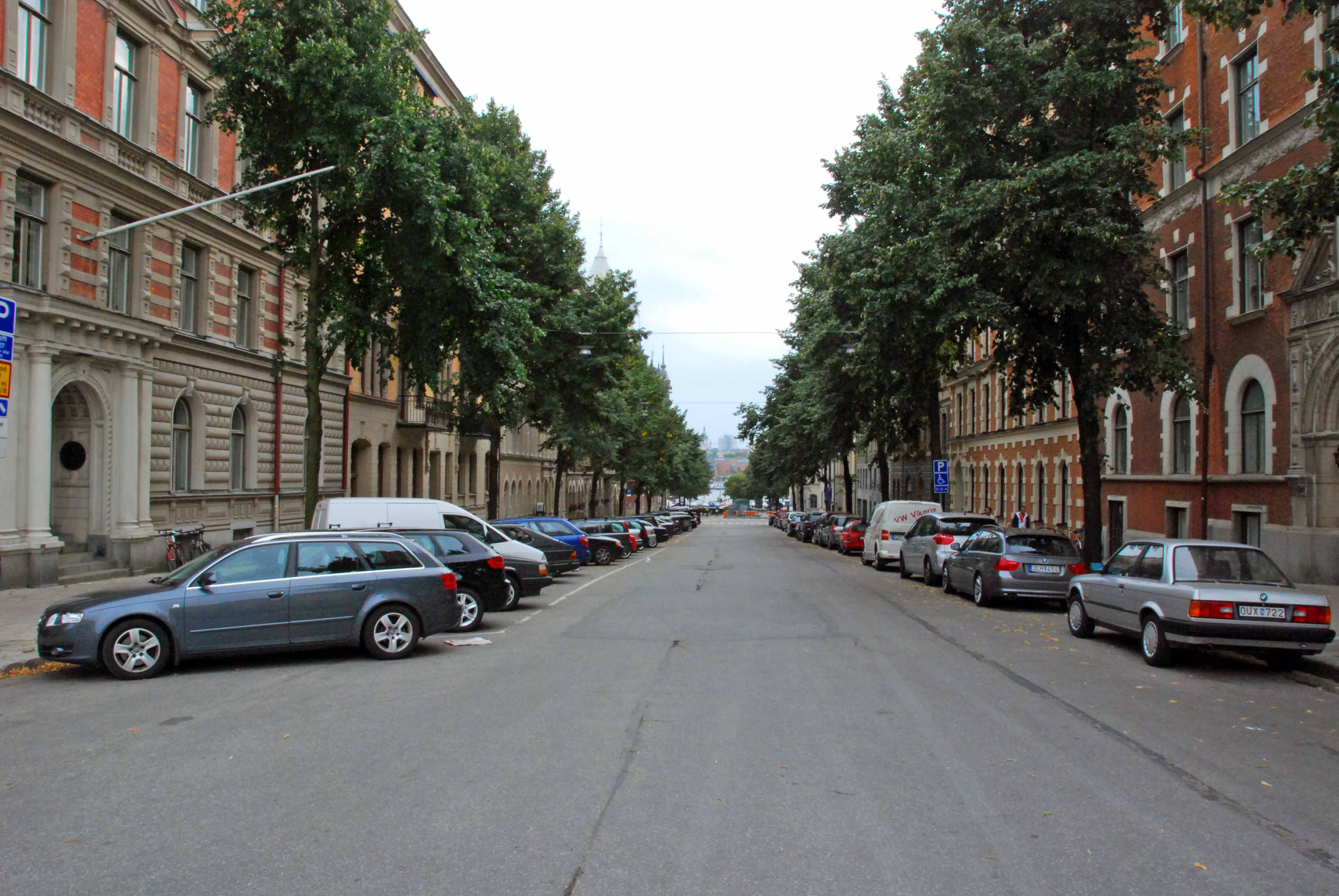
Torstenssonsgatan to Strandvägen and The Moderna Museum on Skeppsholmen

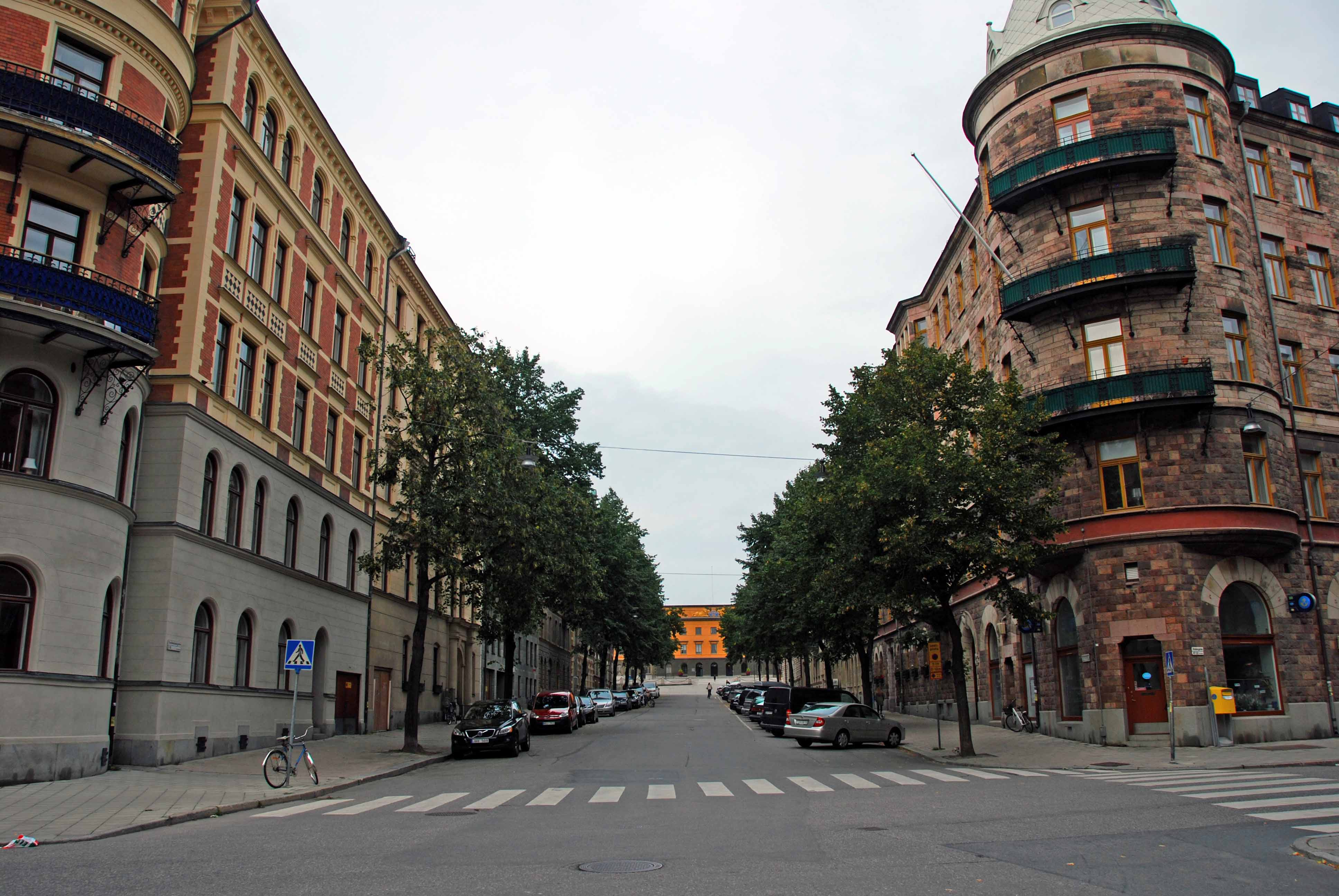
Torstenssonsgatan to The Museum of National Antiquities 2010

Torstenssonsgatan, Östermalm, Stockholm, Sweden, stretches between Strandvägen and Storgatan. The street is crossed by Riddargatan. Torstenssonsgatan is a wide and short avenue (about 200 metres (660 ft) long) with linden trees. In the extension of the street is the Swedish History Museum. The street is a not a through street to Strandvägen.

== History ==
The street is named after Lennart Torstensson, Count of Ortala, Baron of Virestad (17 August 1603 – 7 April 1651), was a Swedish Field Marshal and military engineer.

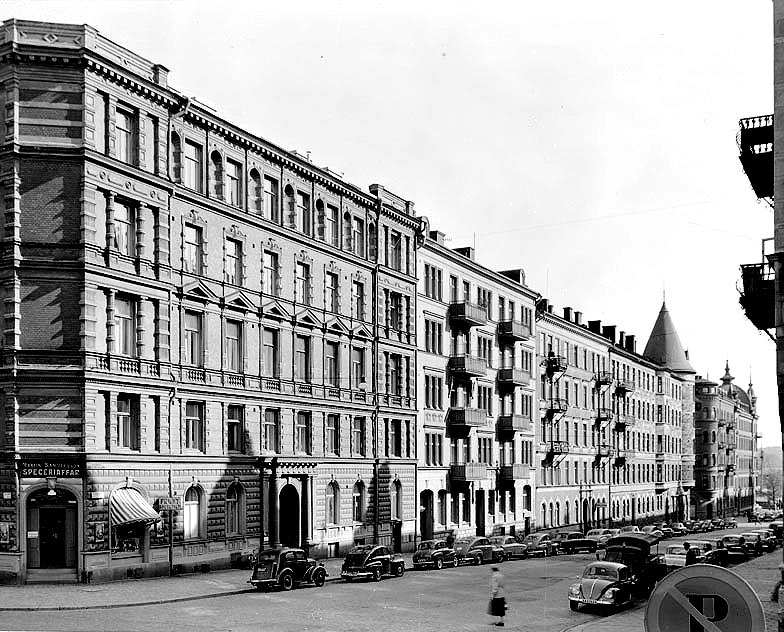
Torstenssonsgatan from Storgatan 1958

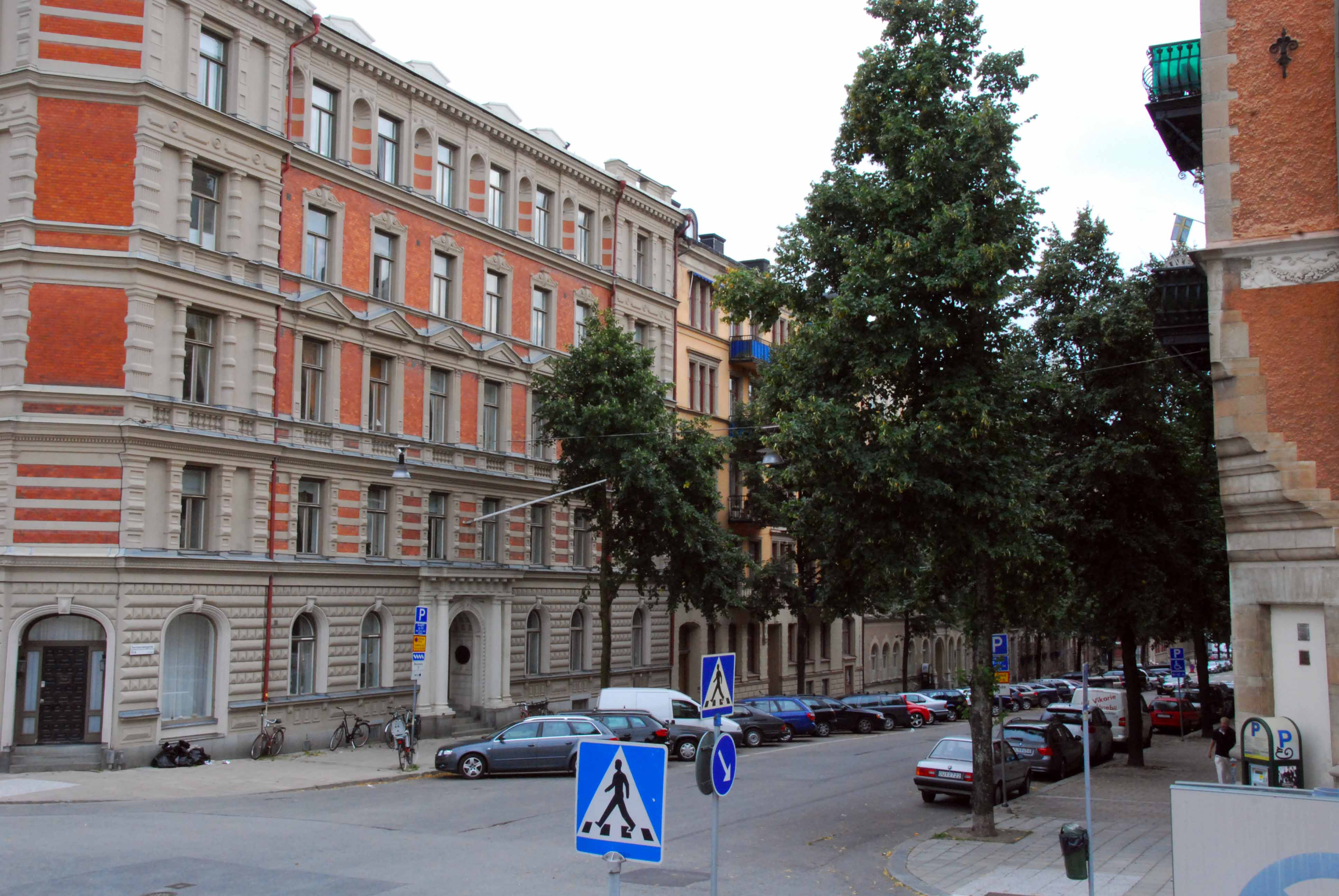
Torstenssonsgatan from Storgatan 2010
