= Chinateatern =

Theatre in Stockholm, Sweden

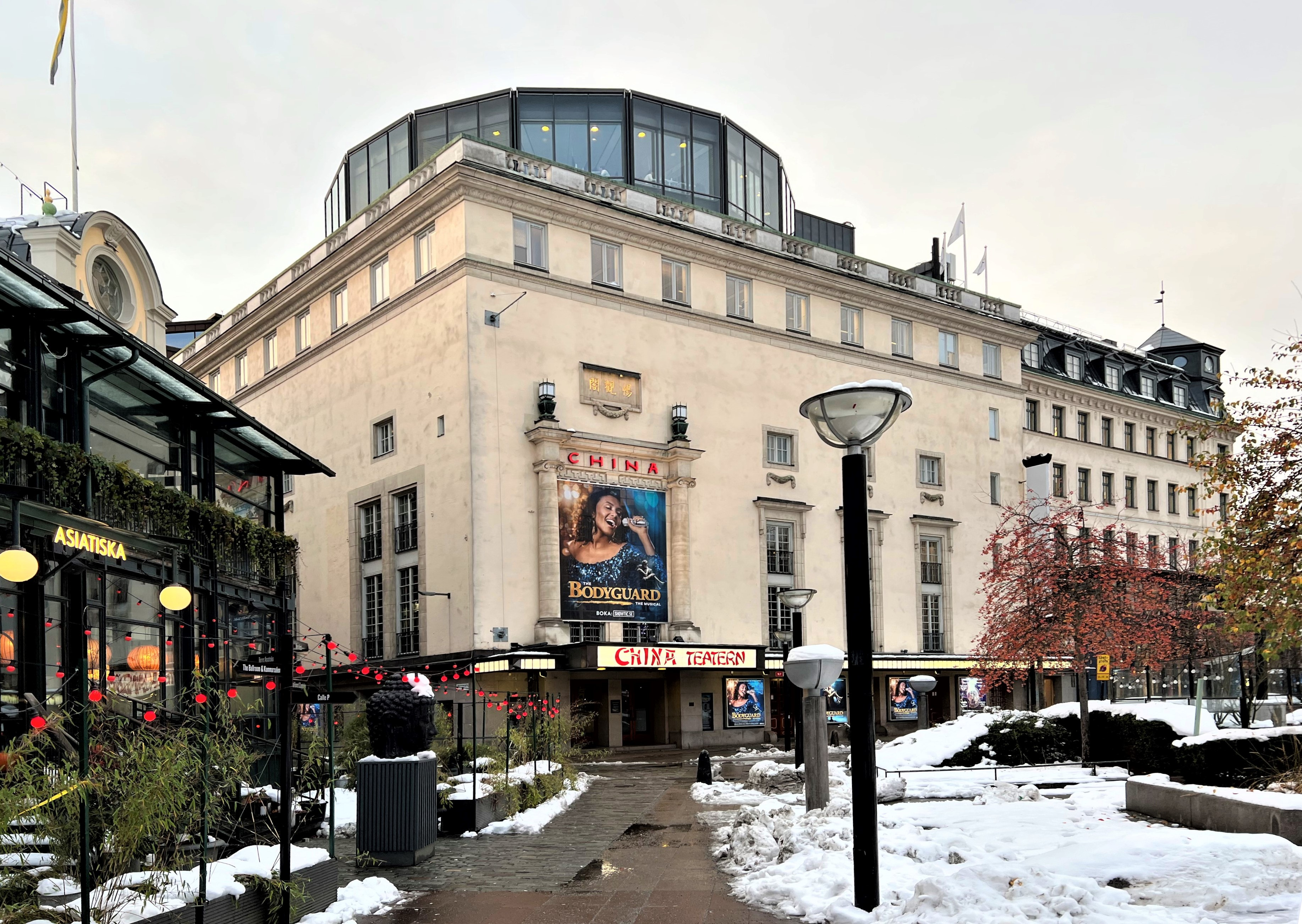
- Chinateatern in 2022
- Interactive map of Chinateatern

Chinateatern or commonly known as "China" (in English: The China Theatre) is a private theatre in Stockholm, Sweden, located at Berzelii Park in Stockholm city. Originally built 1928 as a movie theatre, it has over the years simultaneously been used as a theatre stage for revues, comedies and musical shows. It was very popular in the 1980s and the stage has during various periods been used by different established Swedish theatres, one being the Royal Dramatic Theatre.

Chinateatern is situated next to the Stockholm restaurant Berns Salonger.
