= Nybroviken =

Bay in Stockholm, Sweden

Coordinates: 59°19′52″N 18°04′44″E

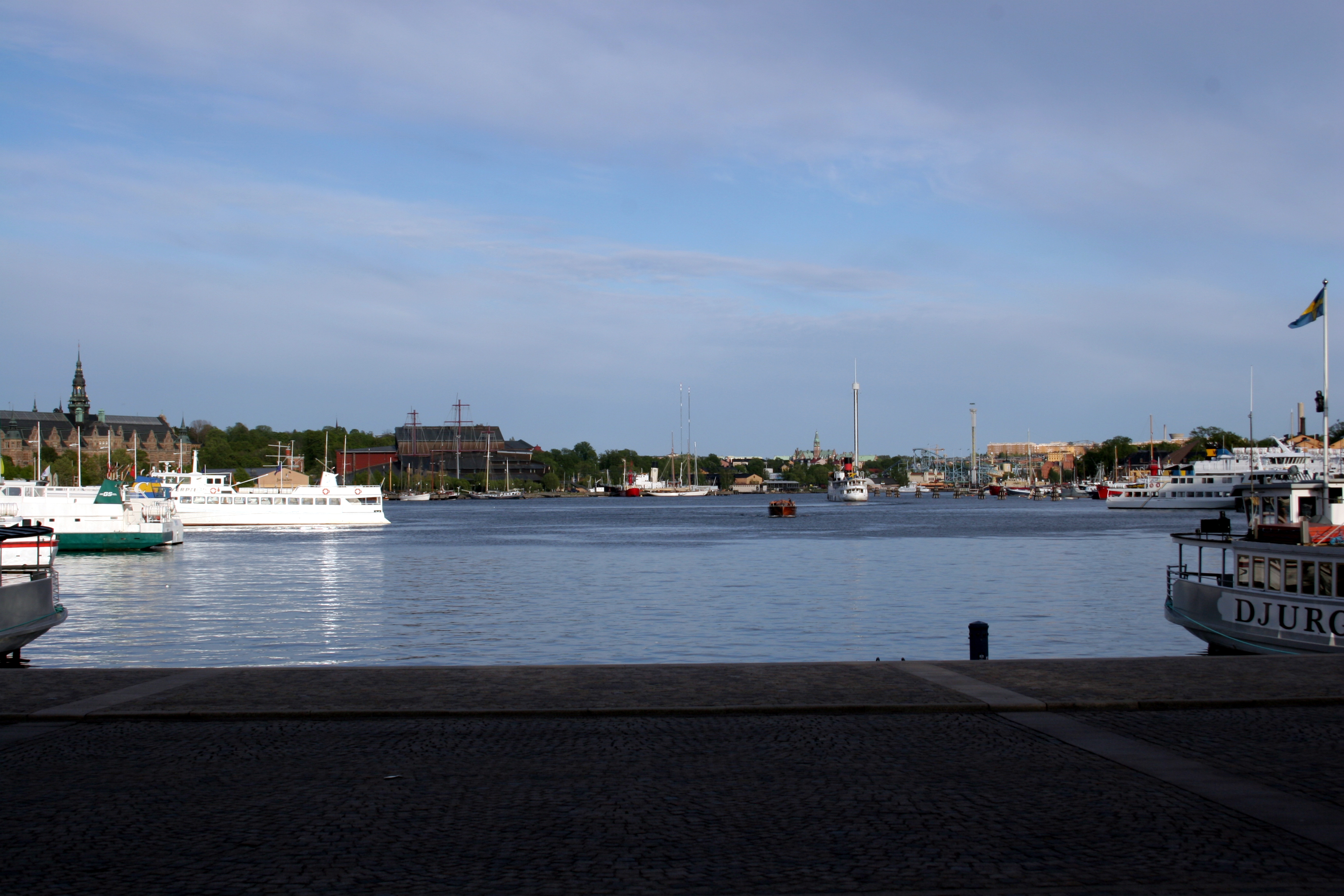
Nybroviken from the northern quay.

Nybroviken (Swedish for "New Bridge Bay") is a bay in central Stockholm, Sweden.

Nybroviken separates the city district Östermalm from the peninsula Blasieholmen. North of the bay is Berzelii Park and Norrmalmstorg. To the south Nybroviken connects to the bay Ladugårdslandsviken. Facing both these bays are the quays of Strandvägen and Nybrokajen.

The name stems from the historical bridge Ladugårdslandsbron ("Barn's Land's Bridge"), also known as Nybro, which once stretched across the bay to connect to Nybrogatan. Today, Nybroviken is a frequently used departure point for ferries of various sizes bound for Djurgården and the Stockholm Archipelago.

== History ==
Map showing 14th century (dotted) and 17th century (dashed) shorelines of Nybroviken. Excavated shipwrecks in red.

In the 17th century, Nybroviken was still known as Ladugårdslandsviken, a name derived from Ladugårdslandet, the histocial name of Östermalm, at the time a rural area. The bay then was much wider, up to 250 metres, and reached north to present-day Stureplan. Two water courses then emptied into the bay: Träskrännilen ("The Swamp Rill"), a strait which connected the bay to the historical lake Träsket ("The Swamp") along the southern part of present-day Birger Jarlsgatan. It was seven metres wide and marked the border between the city districts Norrmalm and Östermalm. Archaeological excavations in the 20th century unveiled ships and landing bridges under the present streets — today located more than 500 metres (1.600 feet) from the waterfront. Both the strait and the lake were made history by land filling around 1880. The second water course was the strait Näckströmmen ("The Neck Stream") which separated Blasieholmen (at the time an island) from the mainland north of it. In the mid-17th century the strait was 20 metres wide in average and 10 metres at its narrowest. The bridge Näckebro stretched across it. Within a century it was consumed by land filling.

Maps from the 18th century name the innermost part of the bay Packartorgsviken or Packartorgssjön ("Packer's Square's Bay/Lake") after the precursor of Norrmalmstorg square. Land fillings and garbage gradually transformed it to standing water with the surrounding quays littered with filth. A map from 1780 shows a single usable landing bridge remained in the bay at that time. In 1816, City Architect Carl Christopher Gjörwell was commissioned to redesign the quays of the bay, plans however only partly completed. Packartorgsviken became gradually smaller and swampier, and was colloquially called Katthavet ("The Cat Sea"), with Katt alluding to something small and false (i.e. a water body of insignificant size).

Fathomless to today's Stockholmers, Katthavet remained a popular spot for angling and pleasure rowing — truly an odd hobby as the filthy bay was also used for cleaning clothes. Not even the cholera pandemic of 1834, which caused the death of 4.000 Stockholmers, resulted in any sanitary actions from the city authorities. By the end of that decade, however, the 25th anniversary of King Charles XIV's arrival to Stockholm resulted in plans for a new bridge across the bay. On royal request, the bay north of the bridge was replaced by land filling, and the bridge thus transformed into a quay. The bridge was designed by Fredrik August Lidströmer, approved by His Majesty in 1837, and works, begun in 1838, were completed in 1849. In 1852, the work to transform the new open space into the present park was begun, and as the statue of Jöns Jacob Berzelius was produced by the Academy of Sciences, the park got its present name, Berzelii Park.

A decision by the city council in 1864 to replace the entire bay with landfills resulted in popular protests led by August Blanche, and in 1867 the council backed out, instead proposing a 395 metres long quay to be built. A statue of John Ericsson by John Börjeson was inaugurated on the quay in 1901. In 1987, part of the quay was renamed in honour of the diplomat Raoul Wallenberg.

== See also ==
- Geography of Stockholm
- Nybroplan
