= Nybrogatan =

Street in Östermalm, Stockholm, Sweden

Coordinates: 59°20′6″N 18°4′41″E

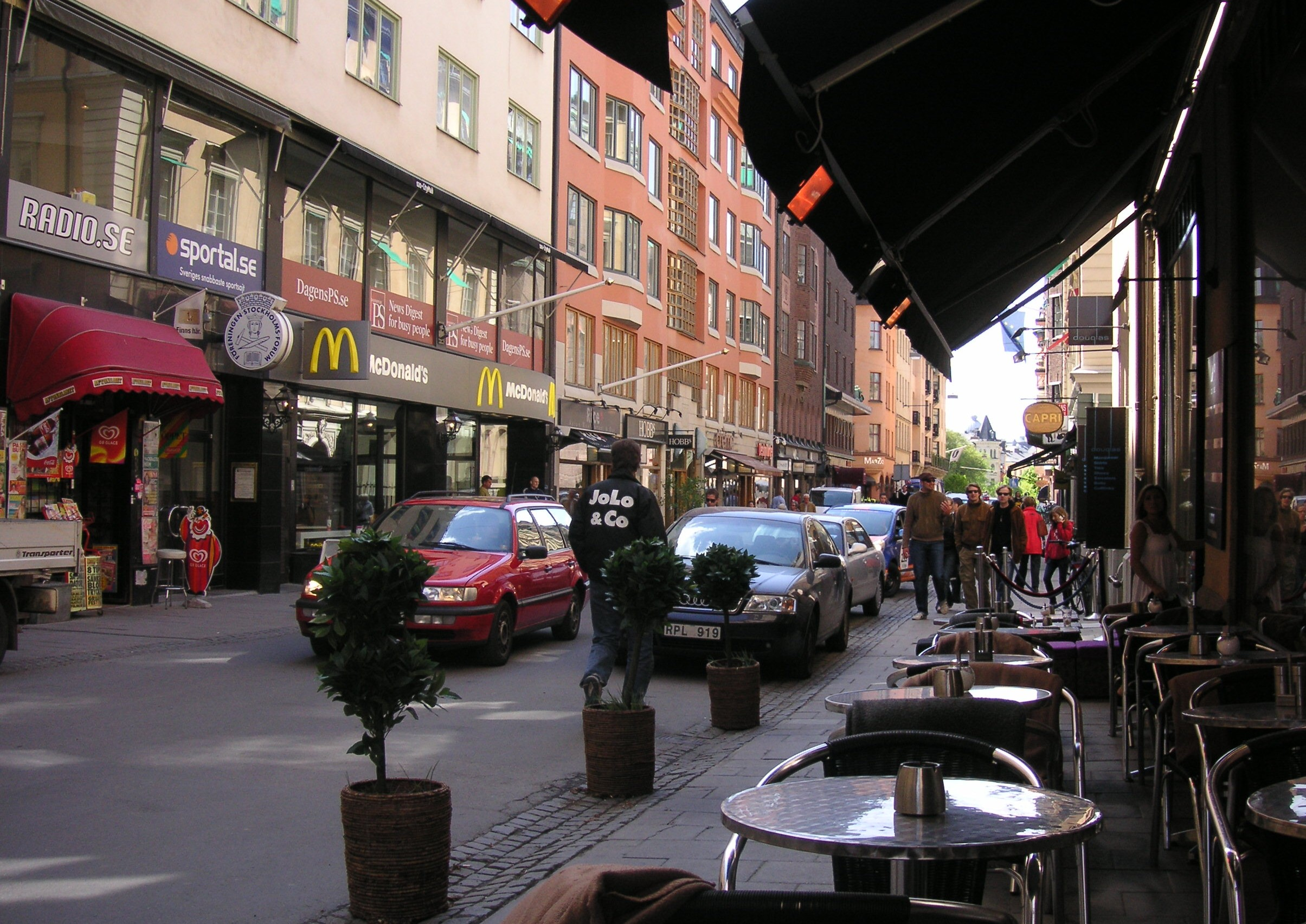
Nybrogatan, view to south, 2008.

Nybrogatan is a street in the borough of Östermalm in central Stockholm, Sweden. Approximately one kilometre in length, it stretches north from Nybroplan to Valhallavägen.

Before 1864, the northern part of Nybrogatan above Östermalmstorg was called Seved Bååtsgatan after a local official. The southern part was named Nybrogatan after a bridge that was constructed over Nybroviken in the 17th century. Later on, the street in its entirety took on this name while the bridge itself became redundant when Nybroviken was filled up in the 19th century.

While Nybrogatan remains a mostly residential street, it also hosts offices, stores, cafés and restaurants and in recent years have seen an increase in the number of commercial establishments.

Östermalmstorg metro station has one of its entrances on Nybrogatan. The only tram line in central Stockholm passes Nybroplan on its route to Djurgården.
