= Hamngatan =

Street in Stockholm, Sweden

Coordinates: 59°20.0′N 18°04.2′E

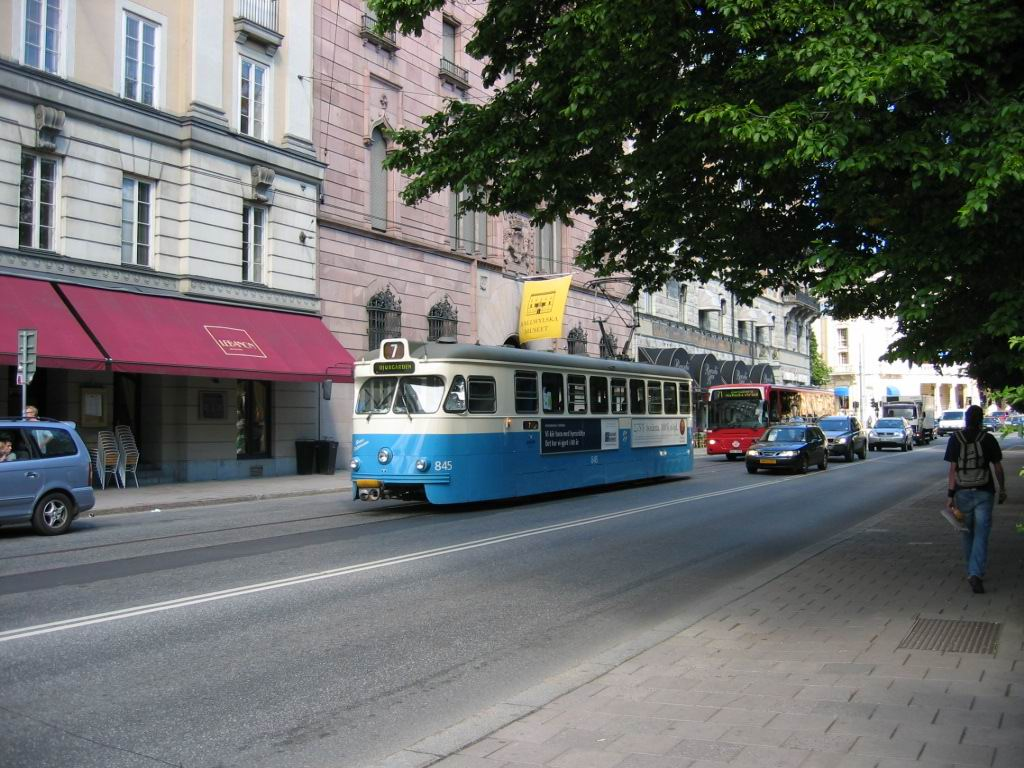
A heritage tram (streetcar) on the Djurgården line passing in front of the Hallwyl Palace on Hamngatan 4.

Hamngatan (Swedish: Port Street) is a street in central Stockholm. It goes from Sergels torg down to Nybroplan, past NK department store, Kungsträdgården, Norrmalmstorg, and Berzelii Park. The Djurgården line travels along this street between Nybroplan and Norrmalmstorg.
