= Berns salonger =

Restaurant in Stockholm, Sweden

Coordinates: 59°19′55.8″N 18°04′26″E

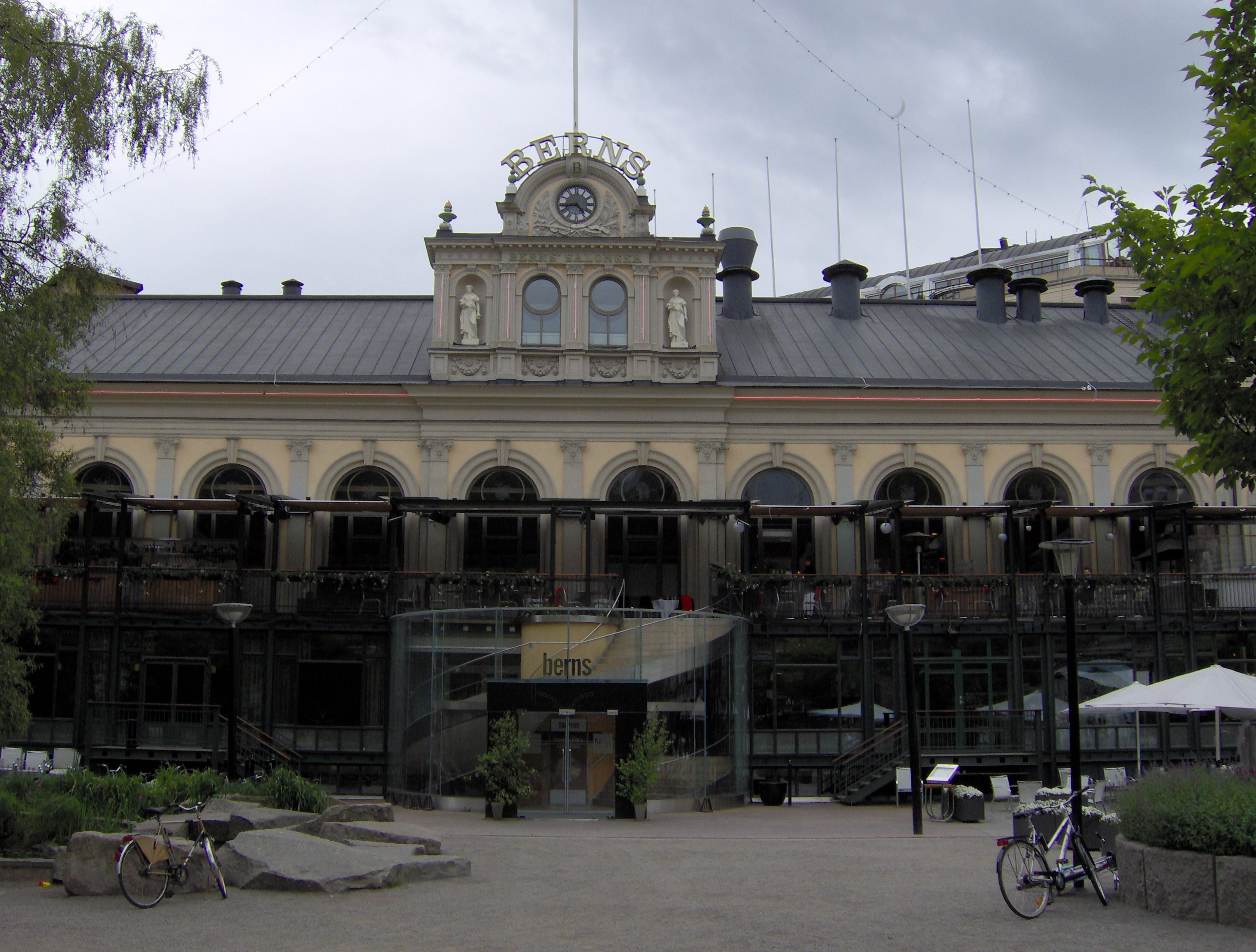
Berns Salonger

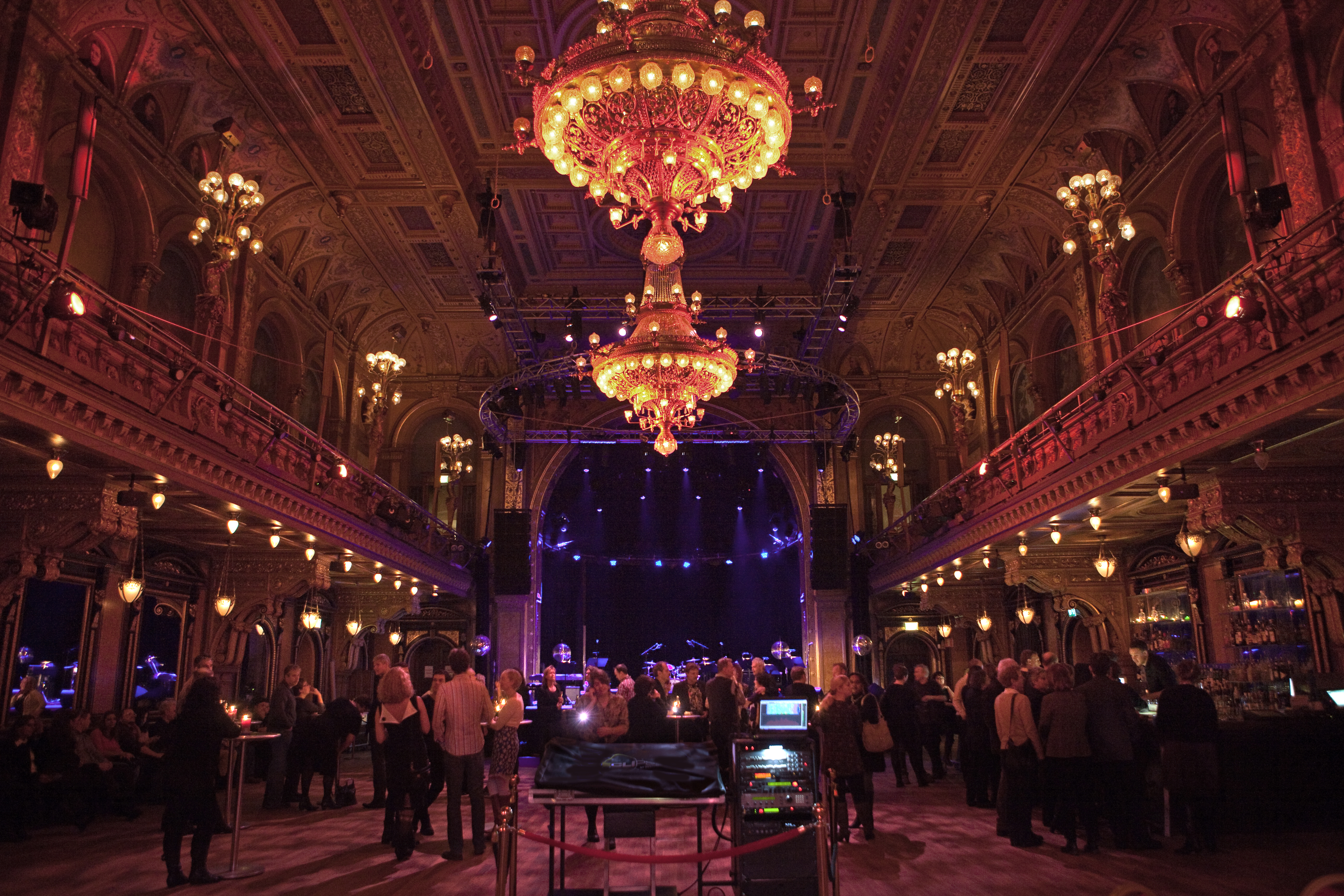
Berns Salonger interior, 2011.

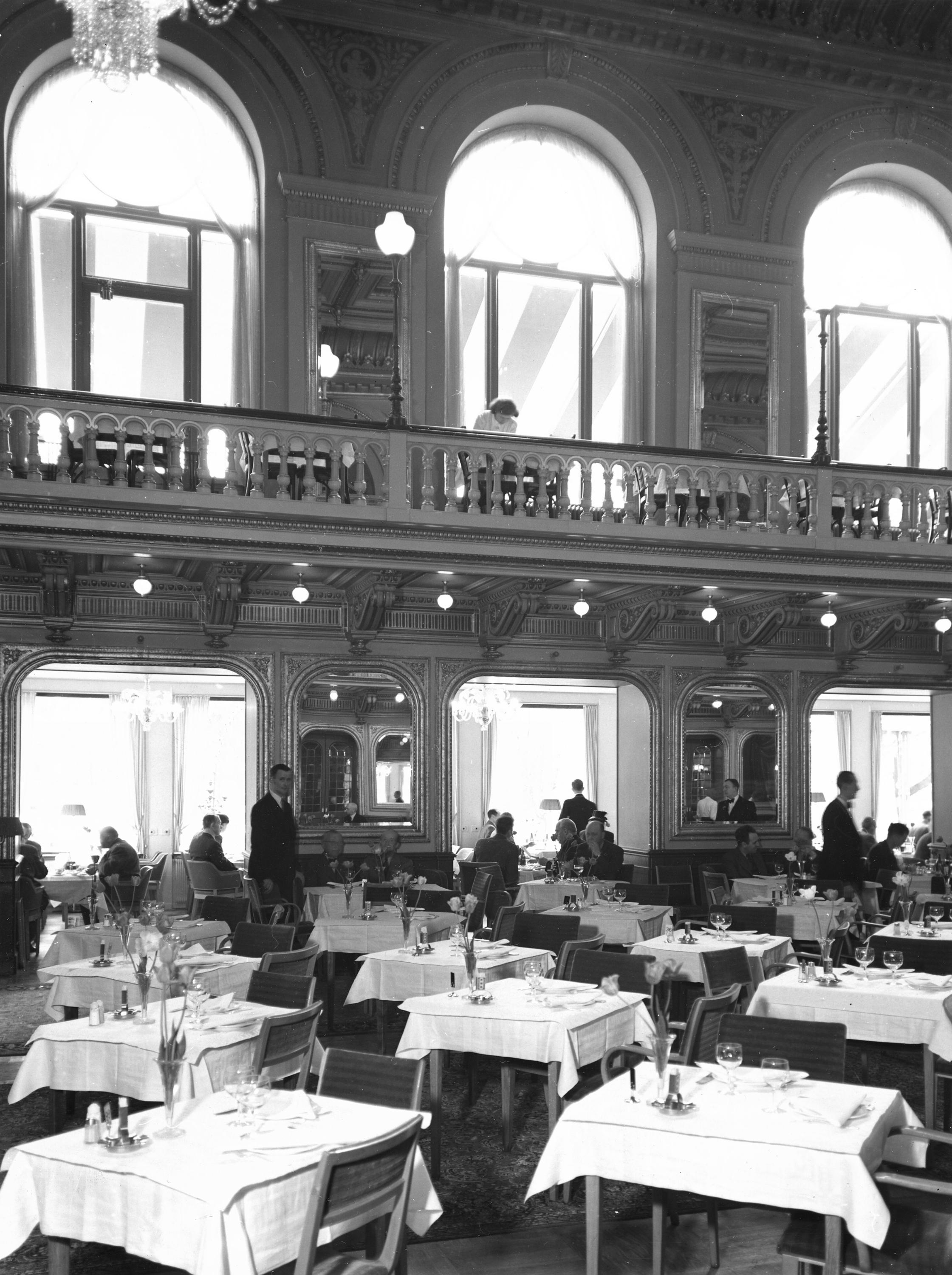
Berns Salonger interior, mid-20th century.

Berns Salonger is a restaurant and entertainment venue, in Berzelii Park, in central Stockholm, Sweden. The building was constructed from 1862 to 1863 by the architect Johan Fredrik Åbom for pastry chef Heinrich Robert Berns and extended in 1886. Berns often holds concerts and other shows and has a capacity of 1,200.

Berns is the setting for the Strindberg novel The Red Room.
