= Arsenalsgatan =

Street in Blasieholmen, Stockholm, Sweden

Coordinates: 59.3306°N 18.0731°E

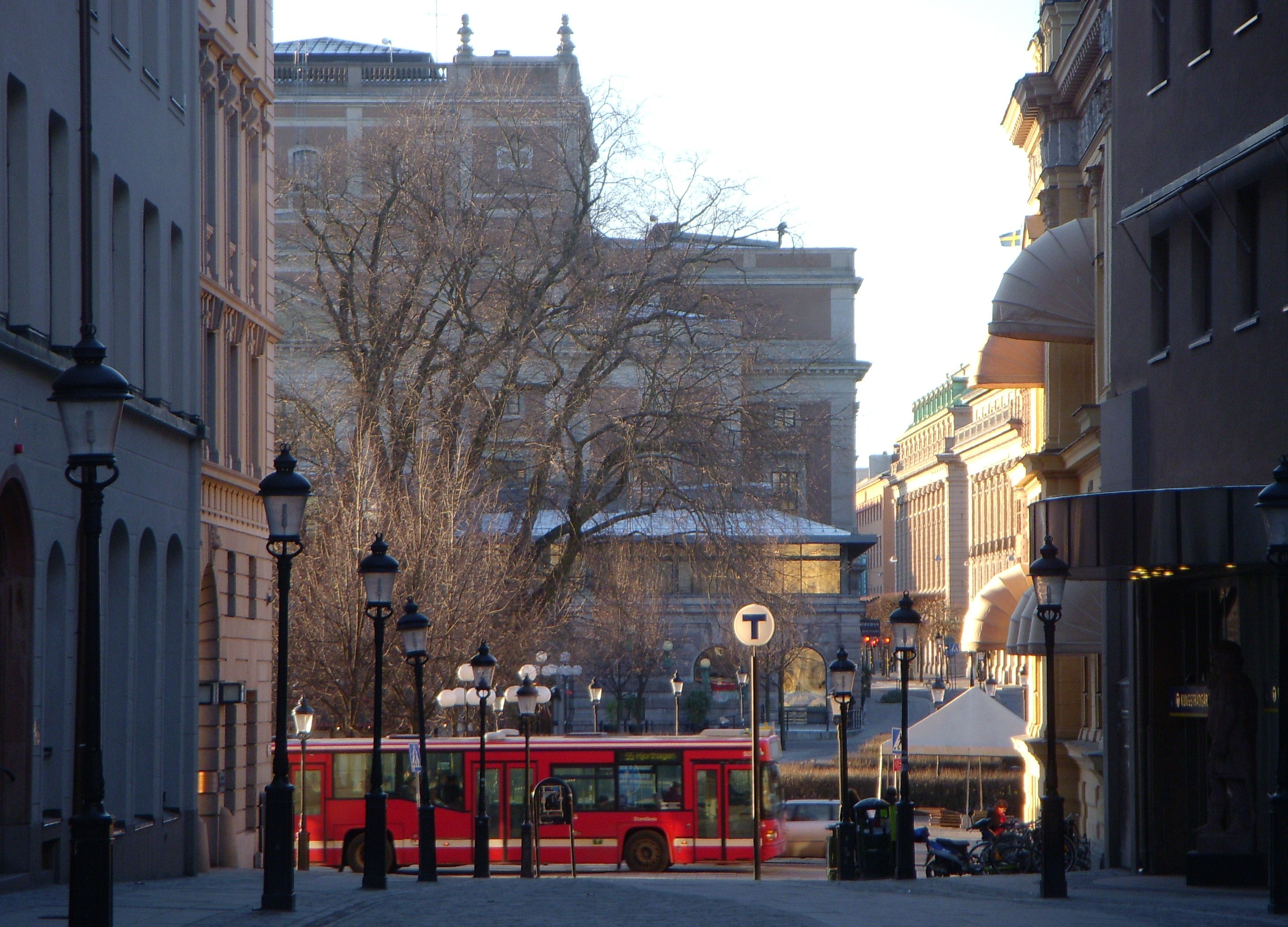
Arsenalsgatan view

Arsenalsgatan is a street on Blasieholmen peninsula in central Stockholm. Arsenalsgatan passes through Blasieholmstorg and is a partly pedestrianised street.
