= Norrmalm =

District of Stockholm

Coordinates: 59°20′N 18°04′E

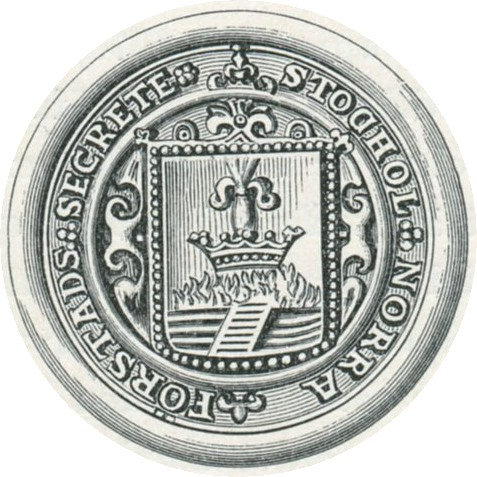
Seal of the district of Norrmalm

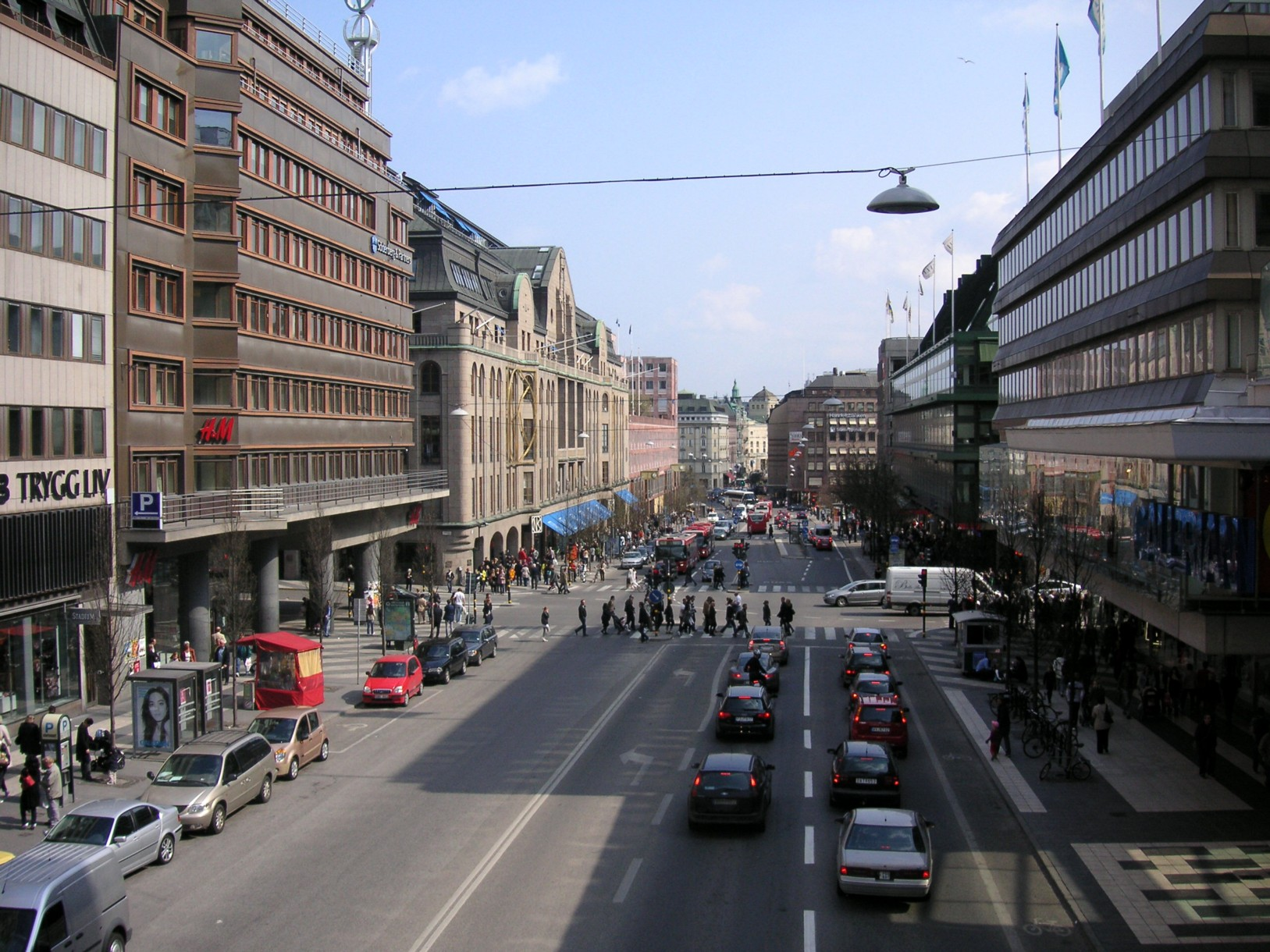
Hamngatan, a street in Norrmalm

Norrmalm is a city district in Stockholm, Sweden.

== History ==
Norrmalm is a part of the larger borough of Norrmalm (Norrmalms stadsdelsområde). The southern part of the district, Lower Norrmalm (Nedre Norrmalm), also known as City, constitutes the most central part of Stockholm, while Upper Norrmalm (Övre Norrmalm) is more residential.

The name Norrmalm is first mentioned in 1288. In 1602, Norrmalm became an independent city with its own mayor and administration called the Northern Suburb (Norra Förstaden). The town was short-lived, and in 1635 it was incorporated with Stockholm again. Norrmalm is today considered to be the central part of Stockholm.

== Redevelopment of Norrmalm ==
In the 1950s and 1960s, large parts of Lower Norrmalm were torn down to build a new and modern city. The demolitions were carried out swiftly, and many Stockholmers still miss "old Klara" (Klara is a part of Lower Norrmalm). Among the new features created as a result of the clearances were the large central public plaza at Sergels torg and the Klara Tunnel (Klaratunneln).

== See also ==
- Norrmalmstorg
- Hötorget
- Kungsträdgården
- Stockholm Central Station
