= Storgatan, Stockholm =

Street in Östermalm, Stockholm, Sweden

Coordinates: 59°20′8.6″N 18°4′48.3″E

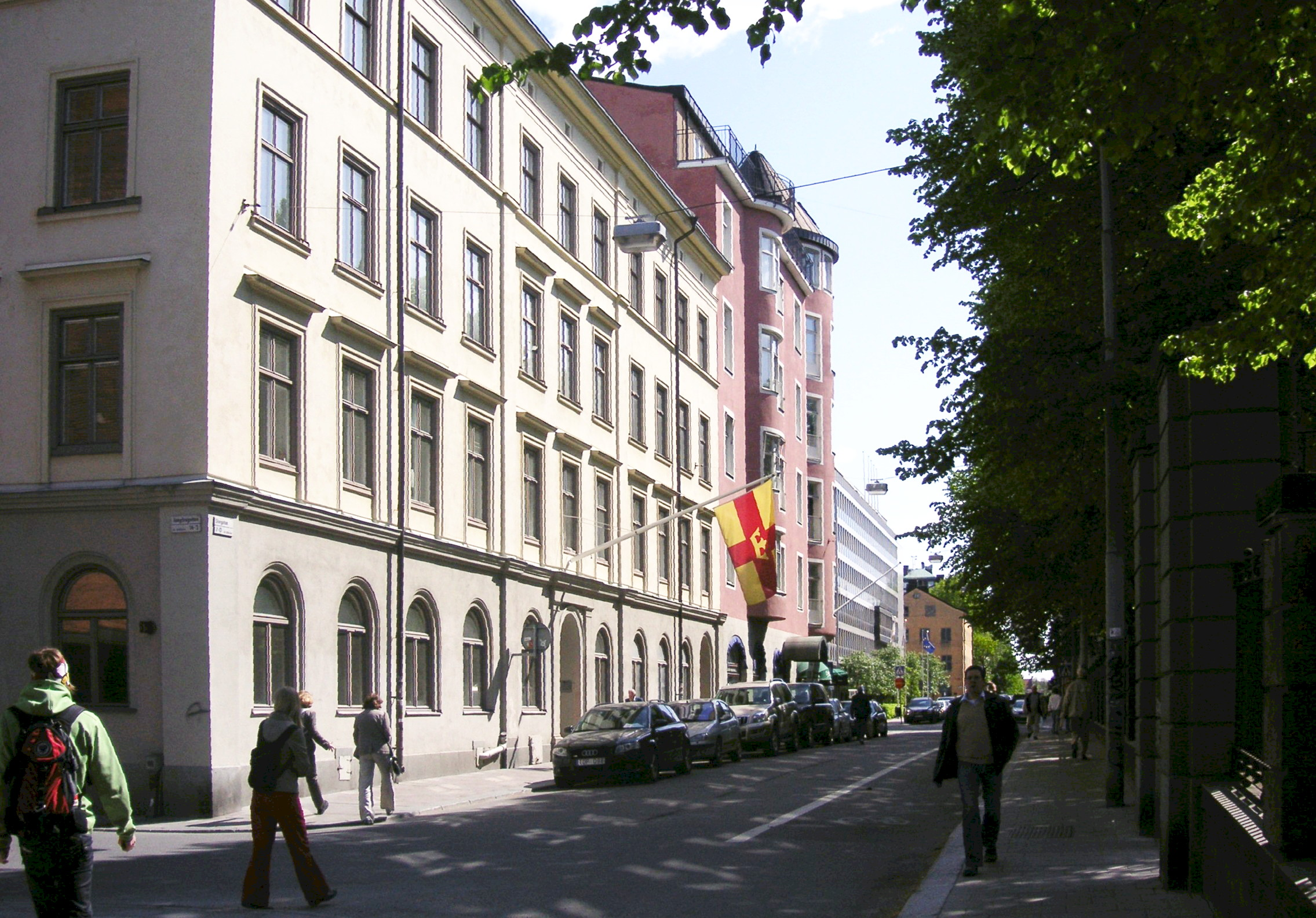
Storgatan to the east, seen from Hedvig Eleonora Church.

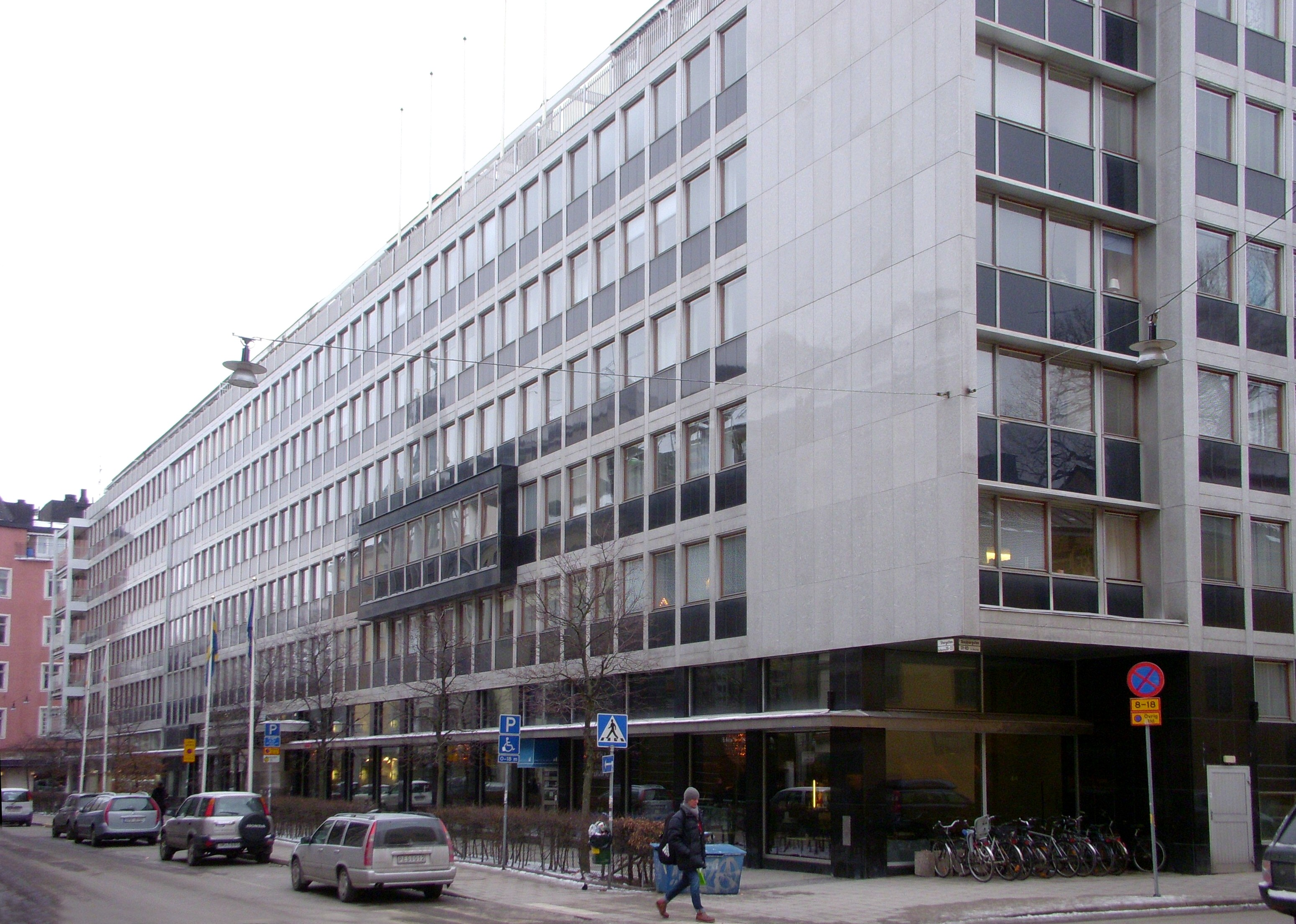
Storgatan to the west, seen from Näringslivets hus.

Storgatan is a street in Stockholm city centre. Two churches are located on the street, Hedvig Eleonora Church and Oscarskyrkan.
