= Riddargatan =

Street in Stockholm, Sweden

Coordinates: 59°20′00″N 18°04′55″E

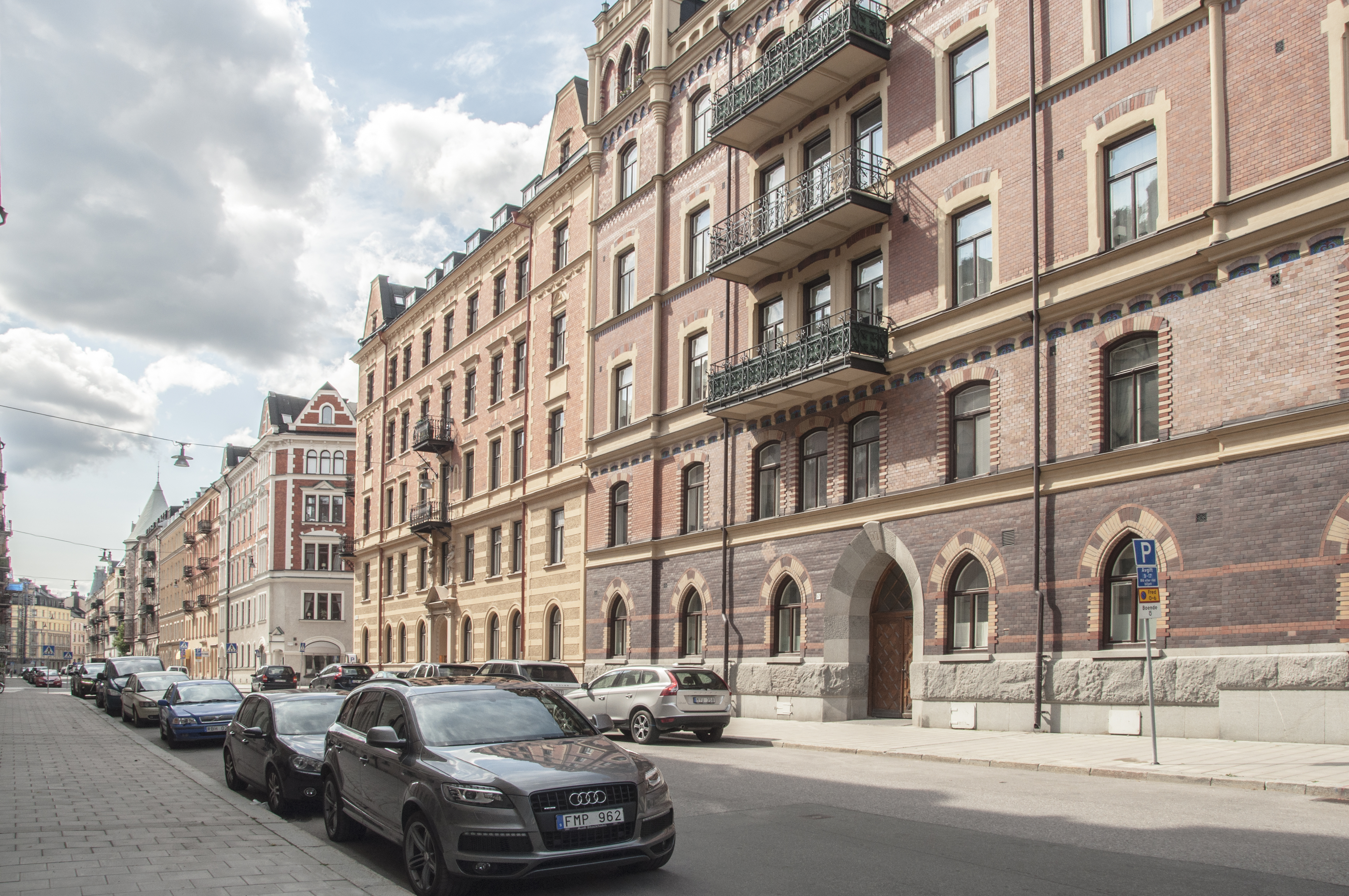
Riddargatan seen from Narvavägen in 2013

Riddargatan is a street in central Stockholm, the capital of Sweden. The Artillery and Engineering College was located at Riddargatan 13 from 1885 to 1926 and the Swedish Army Museum is now based in the same building.
