= Banko =

Banko may refer to:

== People ==
- Anton Banko, Slovenian inventor and engineer
- Wabanko Banko, Congolese boxer
- Banko Brown, see Killing of Banko Brown

== Places ==
- Banko, Guinea, a town and sub-prefecture in the Dabola Prefecture in the Faranah Region
- Banko, Mali, a rural commune and village in the Cercle of Dioïla in the Koulikoro Region
- Banko, a town in the Sekyere Kumawu district of Ghana

== Other uses ==
- Banko ware, a type of Japanese ceramics
- BanKo Perlas Spikers, Philippine women's volleyball team

== See also ==
- Banco (disambiguation)
