= Hans E. Wallman =

Swedish entrepreneur, composer, director, author, producer and executive

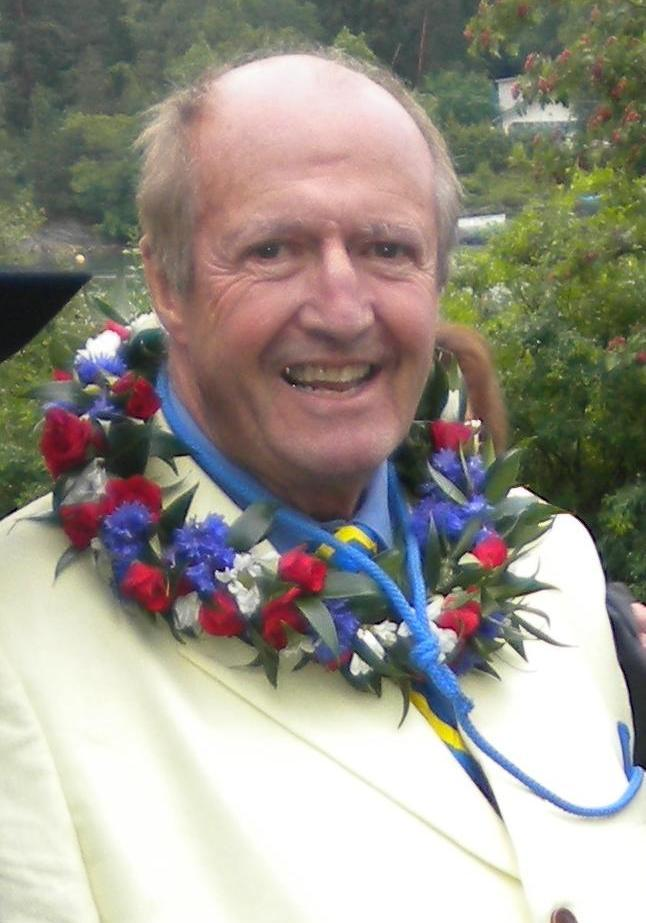
Wallman celebrating his 75th birthday at home east of Stockholm in 2011

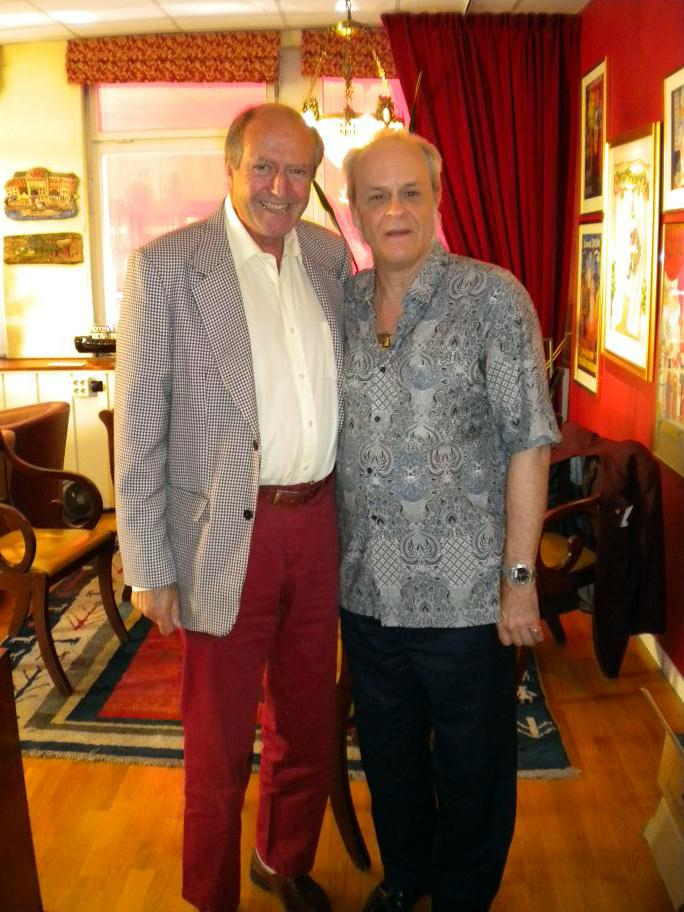
Wallman (left) in his Stockholm office in 2009 (with Lars Jacob)

Hans Erik "Hasse" Wallman (1 May 1936 – 22 September 2014), was a Swedish entrepreneur, impresario, composer, director, author, producer and entertainment executive. At his own venues in Stockholm he has presented acts like the Beatles (1963), Rolling Stones and Lill-Babs.

== Career ==
Wallman was born in Stockholm. He went to Beckmans school of advertising, was in charge of publicity for Elektra Records in Sweden 1965–1966 and was hired to head promotion for the Gröna Lund amusement park 1961–1968. From 1956 he has had his own company; he ran an entertainment palace called Kingside 1956–1962, the restaurant Badholmen Saltsjöbaden in 1962–1968, Knäppingen in Norrköping 1964–1968, Bacchi Wapen 1972–1993, the hotel ship Mälardrottningen on the Lady Hutton 1982–1996, Chinateatern 1982–1991 och Folkan Theater 1991–2005. In Stockholm he had Engelen och Kolingen from 1969, Golden Hits from 1994, and Intiman Theatre from 1997. He started the Wallmans Salonger chain in 1991 and developed the concept of waiters and waitresses putting on a big nightclub show.

For his contributions to entertainment he was awarded Guldmasken in 1991, named "company owner of the year" for Stockholm in 2000, was given the Albert Bonnier Prize for company owners in 2003 and dubbed Old Dane of the Year by an organization in Malmö in 2007. Wallmans Nöjen (Wallman's Fun Things) continues to run many of the restaurants he had.

He hosted Sommar in 2008.

== Personal life ==
Wallman married his wife Marie (1941–2018) in 1965, and they had a daughter Veronica the following year and a son Marcus in 1970.

He died on 22 September 2014 of injuries sustained in a riding accident at his home in Värmdö.

== Directed movies ==
- 1967 Drra på – kul grej på väg till Götet
- 1966 Grejen

== Movie scripts ==
- 1967 Drra på – kul grej på väg till Götet
- 1966 Åsa-Nisse i raketform

== Movie parts ==
- 1965 Åsa-Nisse slår till
- 1965 För tapperhet i tält

== Bibliography ==
- För nöjes skull; Hasse Wallman berättar för Olov Svedelid ISBN 91-7055-204-5
