= Södra Dryckesgränd =

Alley in Gamla stan, Stockholm, Sweden

Coordinates: 59°19′20″N 18°04′25″E

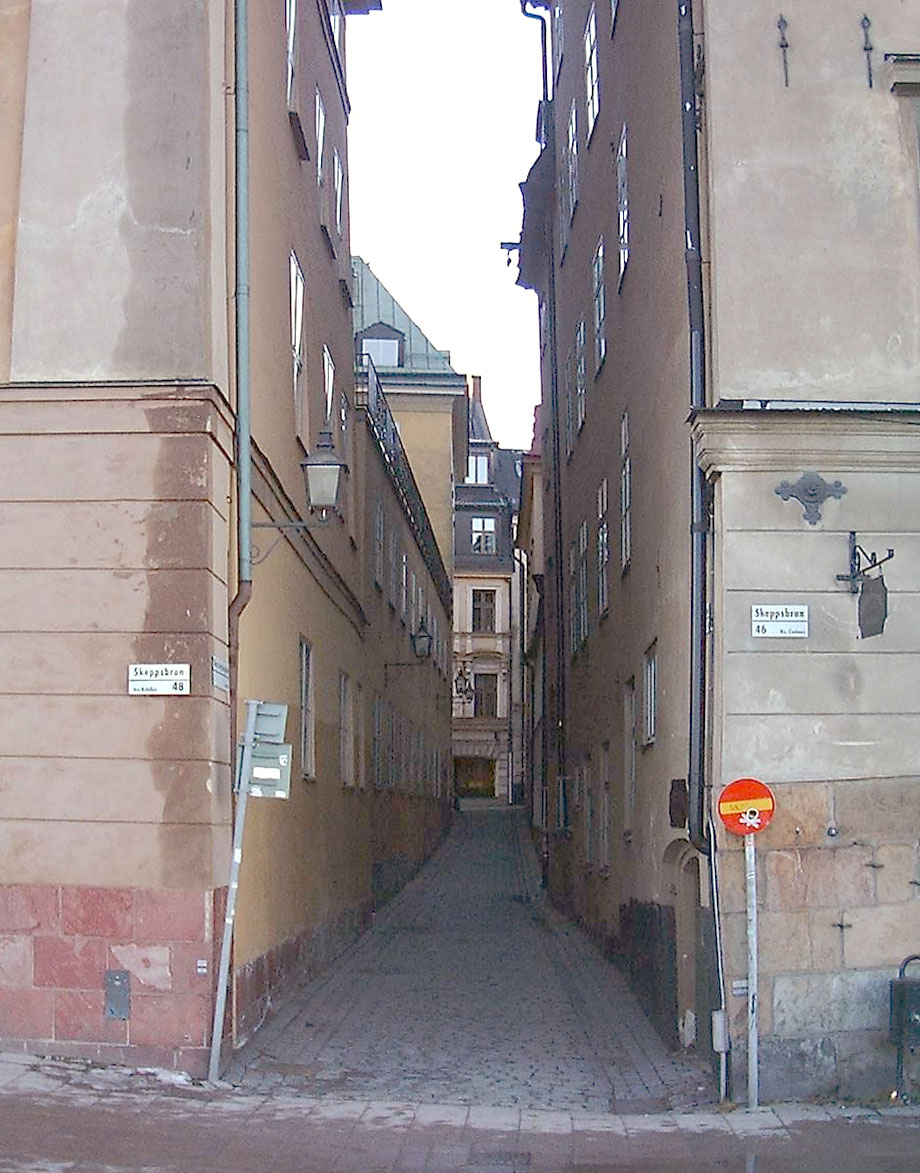
Södra Dryckesgränd in February 2007.

Södra Dryckesgränd (Swedish: "Southern Drunkenness Alley") is an alley in Gamla stan, the old town of Stockholm, Sweden. Connecting Skeppsbron to Järntorgsgatan, it forms a parallel street to Norra Dryckesgränd and Slussplan.

The alley appears in historical records as cartusegrenden (1518), södre Cartuse grennen (1527), chartuser gränden (1625), Södra Drycks gr[änd] (1733), and Dryks-Gränden (1740). The reason for the present name of the alley is unknown. See Norra Dryckesgränd for further details.

== See also ==
- List of streets and squares in Gamla stan
