= Skeppsbrokajen =

Wharf in Gamla stan, Stockholm, Sweden

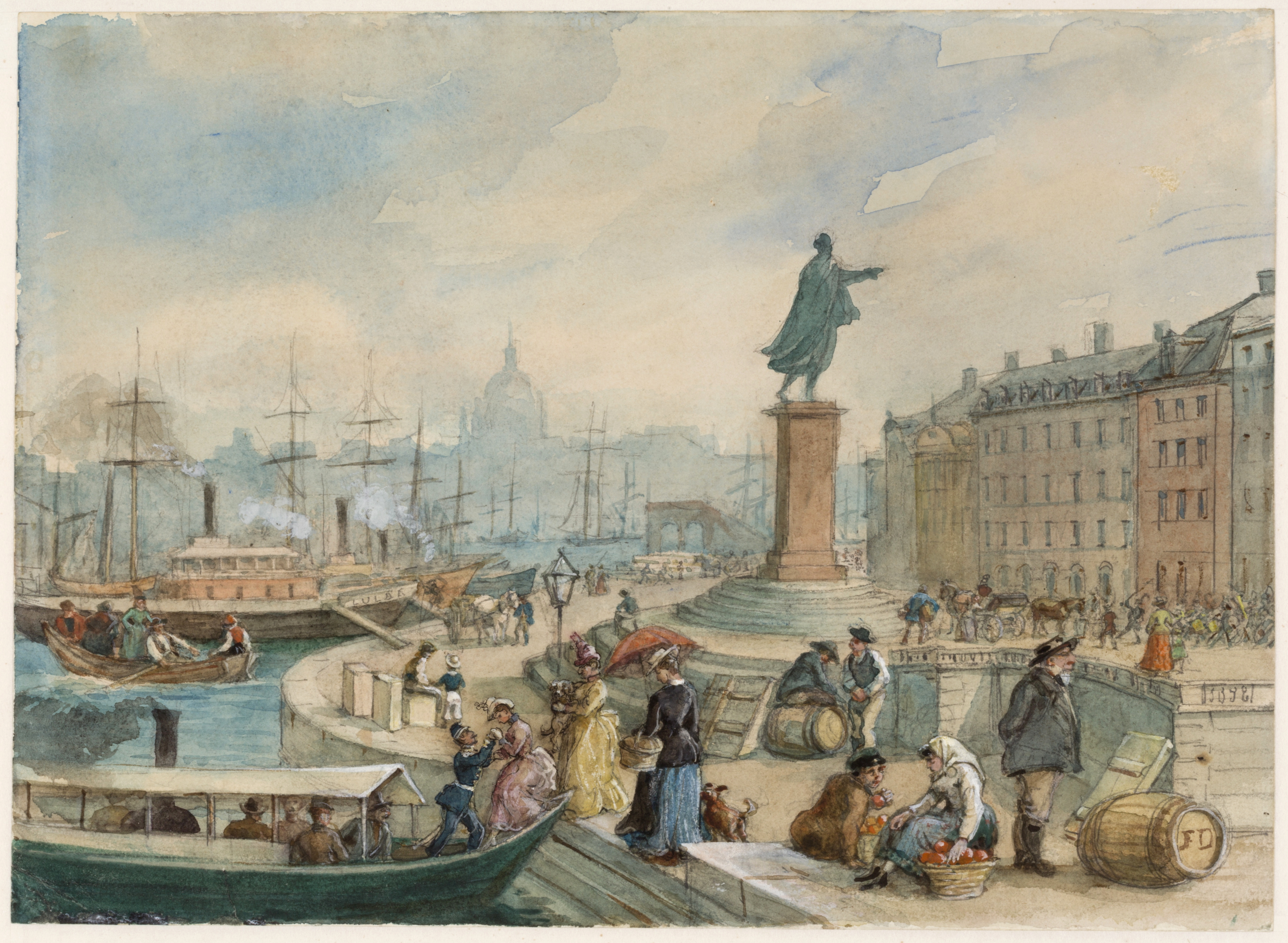
Watercolour of Skeppsbron and the statue of Gustav III by Fritz von Dardel, 1860.

Skeppsbrokajen (Swedish: "Ship's Bridge's Quay") is a quay in central Stockholm, Sweden. Passing along Skeppsbron, it forms the east waterfront of the old town Gamla stan.

== History ==
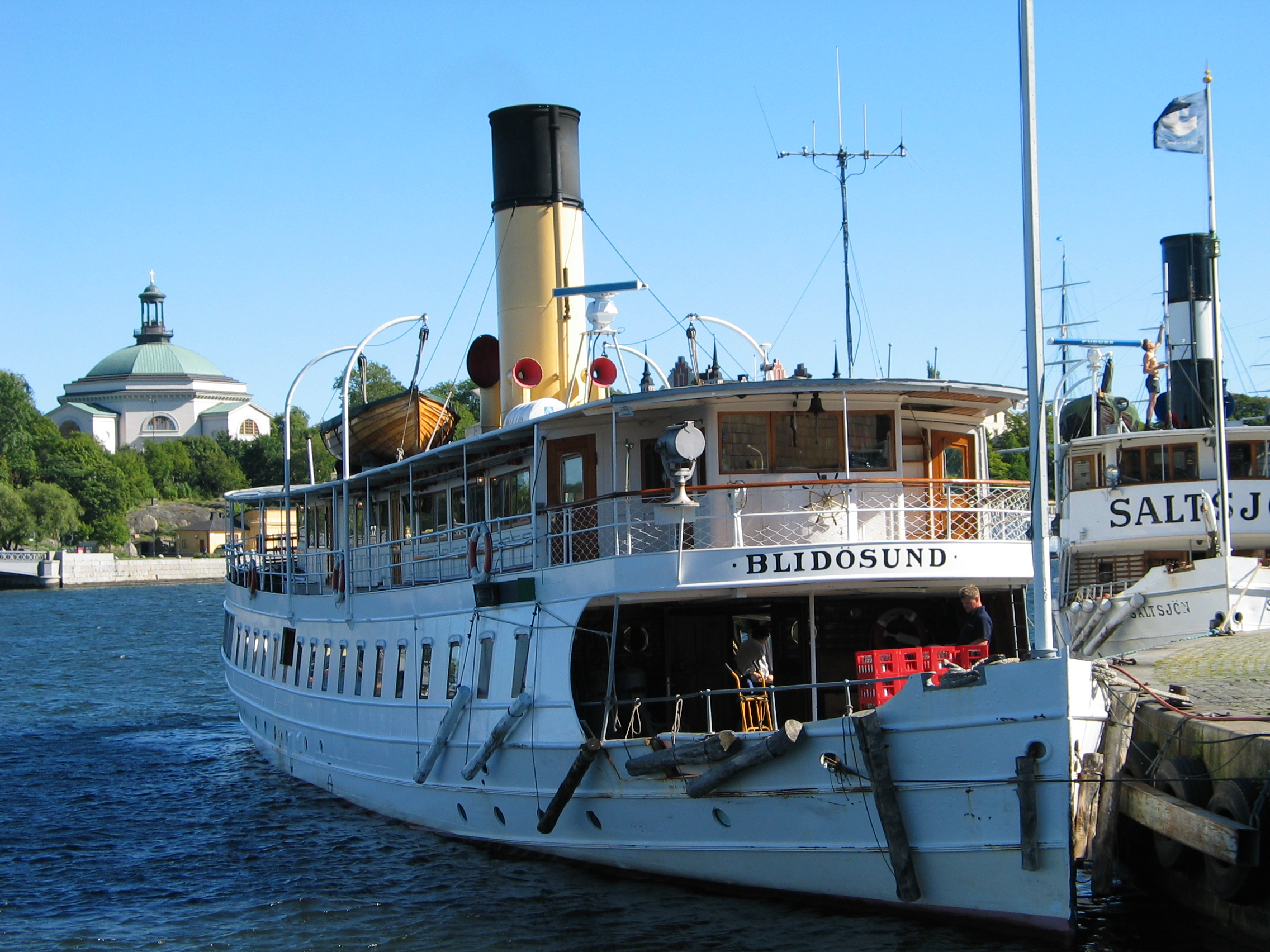
The steamships S/S Blidösund and Saltsjön moored on Skeppsbrokajen.

Skeppsbrokajen was preceded by a medieval quay called Koggabron ("Cog bridge") located a hundred metres inland from the present quay and only stretching along the southern part of the shore. During the 1630s, the work on the foundations of the present quay were begun, probably initiated by King Gustavus Adolphus. While the present name came into use during the period 1640–1700, the quay itself was not completed until 1854 when the area around Slussen was developed in connection to the construction of the lock of Nils Ericson.

While the quay is still frequently used by ships, including international cruisers and locally well-known ships: a couple of old steamships, such as SS Blidösund (1911) and SS Saltsjön (1925); and some somewhat less genuine, such as MS Teaterskeppet, ("The Theatre Ship"), a Portuguese fishing boat built in 1959, today serving as a conference centre; and Svea Viking, originally a minesweeper built in the UK in 1943 for D-Day, then serving as ferry on Öland for many years before being transformed into a Viking ship in 1996.

In the northern end of the quay, next to the Royal Palace is the statue of King Gustav III by Tobias Sergel inaugurated in 1808, and in the southern end is the sculpture Sjöodjuret ("Sea monster") by Carl Milles.

== See also ==
- List of streets and squares in Gamla stan

== Gallery ==
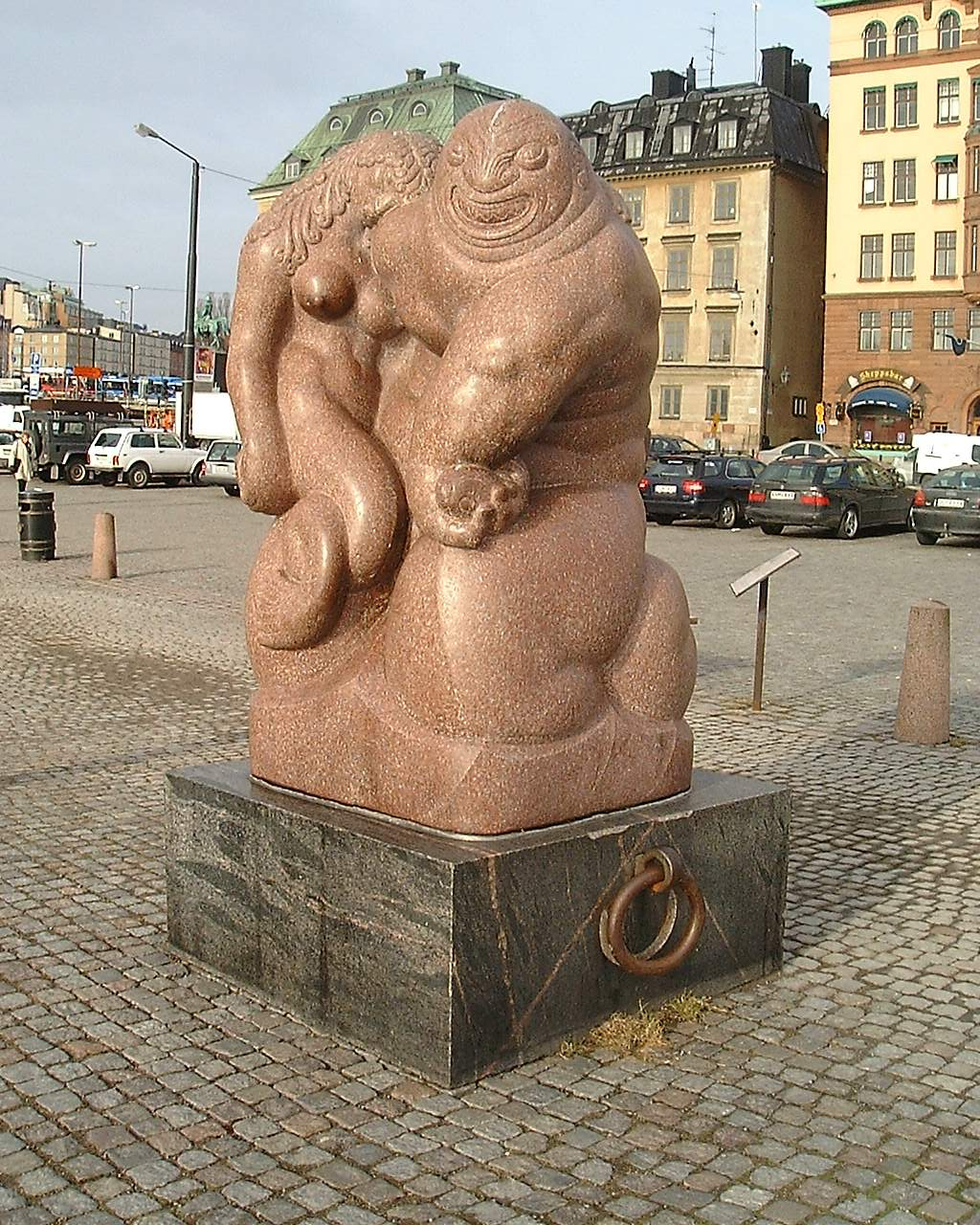
Sculpture Sjöguden by Carl Milles.
