= Bacchi Wapen =

Music venue and restaurant in Stockholm, Sweden

Coordinates: 59°19′20″N 18°4′22″E

Bacchi Wapen was a high-end music venue and restaurant in Järntorgsgatan, Gamla stan, Stockholm, Sweden. The building is several centuries old and is a fine example of 18th century neo-classical architecture.

Bacchi Wapen went bankrupt in 2002 but opened again in 2004 under the name Bacci Bar, and in 2007 as the mixed and gay bar Pigalle. Since 2009, the location is used by a bar belonging to the O'Learys sports bar franchise.

Artists who have performed at the venue include Lill-Babs, Lill Lindfors, Lars Berghagen, Rockfolket, Laila Westersund, Gösta Linderholm, Sveriges Jazzband, Bernt Dahlbäck, Cornelis Vreeswijk, Eva Rydberg, Ewa Roos, Jarl Borssén, Owe Thörnqvist, Kalle Sändare, Trio Hellenique, etc.
