= Norra Bankogränd =

Alley in Gamla stan, Stockholm, Sweden

Coordinates: 59°19′21.4″N 18°04′26.7″E

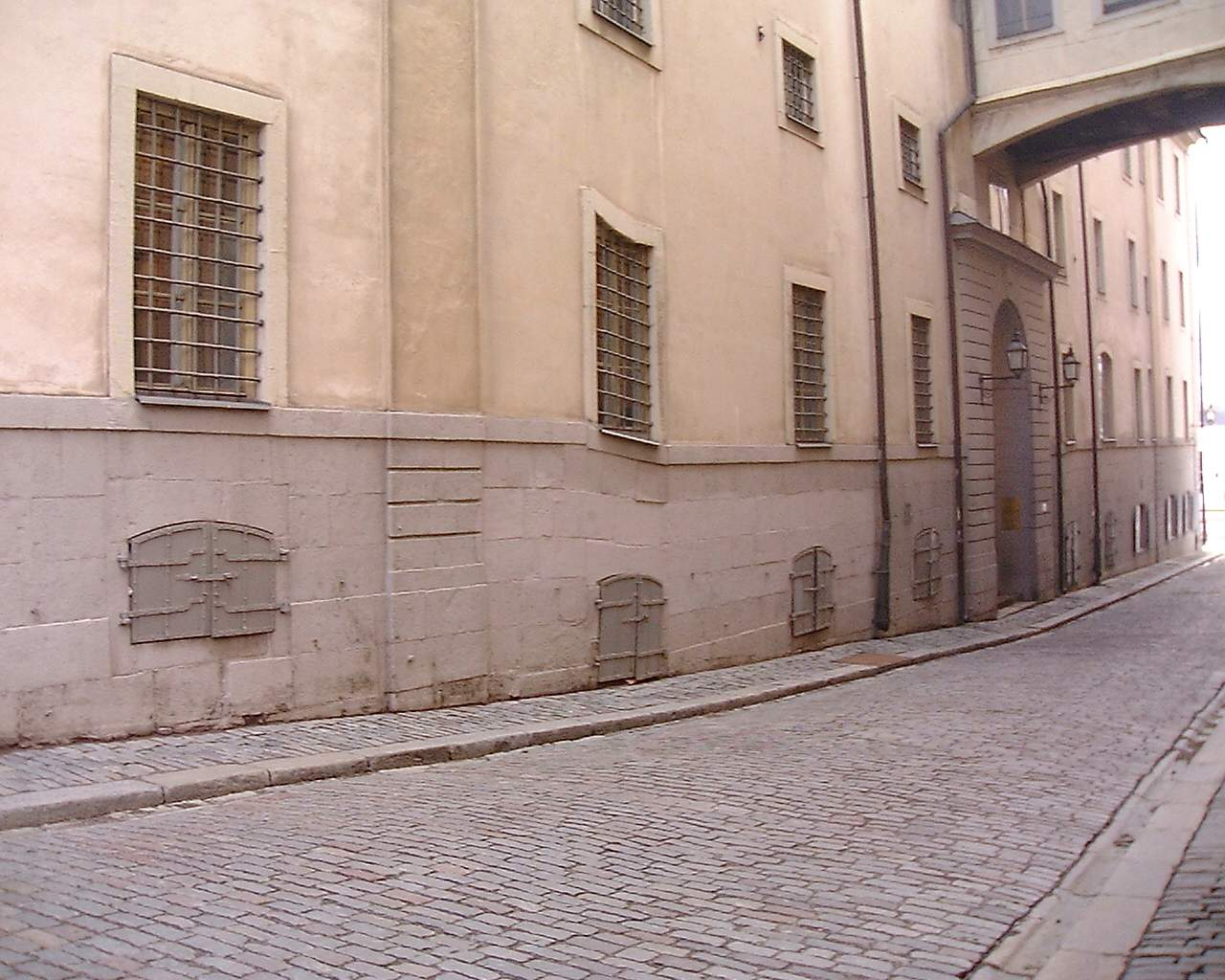
Warped window in the alley showing the defective foundation of the building on the northern side.

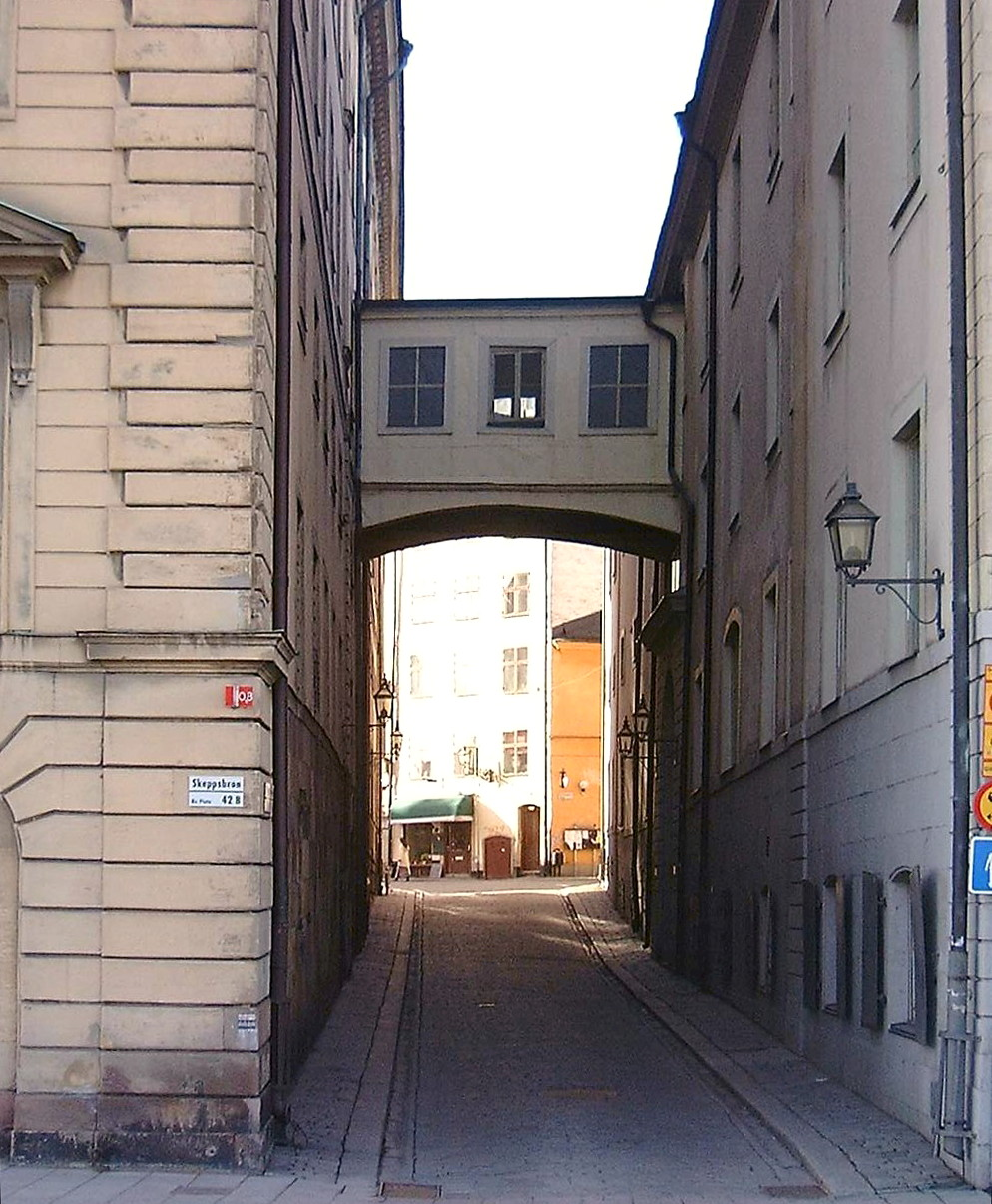
Norra Bankogränd in March 2007.

Norra Bankogränd (Swedish: "Northern Bank Alley") is an alley in Gamla stan, the old town of Stockholm, Sweden. Connecting Skeppsbron to Österlånggatan and Järntorget, it forms a parallel street to Tullgränd and Södra Bankogränd.

The alley passes north of Södra Bankohuset, the former building of the Bank of Sweden, constructed by the architect Nicodemus Tessin the Elder (1615–1684) during the period 1666–1682. On various maps it is recorded as Banco-gränden (1729) and Norra Bancogränd (1733).

The part of the building facing Skeppsbron was rebuilt later. The covered bridge passing over the alley was added when the northern bank building was built during the 1770s. The bank moved to Helgeandsholmen in 1906.

== See also ==
- List of streets and squares in Gamla stan
