= Norra Dryckesgränd =

Alley in Gamla stan, Stockholm, Sweden

Coordinates: 59°19′20.4″N 18°04′25.5″E

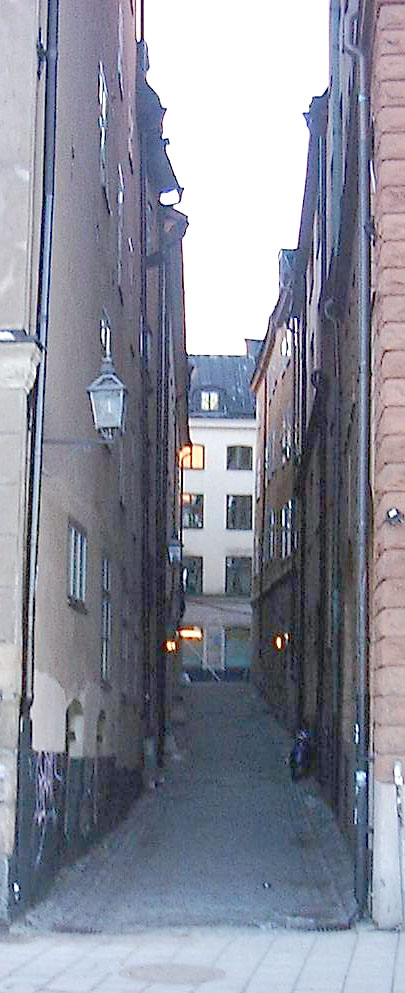
Norra Dryckesgränd in February 2007.

Norra Dryckesgränd (Swedish: Northern Drunkenness Alley) is an alley in Gamla stan, the old town of Stockholm, Sweden. Connecting Skeppsbron to Järntorgsgatan it forms a parallel street to Södra Bankogränd and Södra Dryckesgränd.

== History ==
Appearing in historical records as Cartusegrenden in 1518, norra cartuse grenden in 1526, chartuser gränden in 1625, Norra Dryks gr[änd] in 1733 and Dryks-Gränden in 1740, its original name is derived from the Carthusian Order which owned a building in the alley. While this order, founded in the French valley of Chartreuse in 1084 and introduced to Sweden by a royal land donation at Gripsholm in 1490, is known as one of the strictest of the Catholic Church, it was however thrown out of the kingdom by King Gustav Vasa in the 1520s together with many other abbeys. It is since mostly remembered for the liqueur, Chartreuse, produced by the monks in France.

While the reason for the present name is unknown, the description of a homicide in the eastern end of the alley in 1622 gives an idea of the reputation it must have had. Arguably, it has been suggested the current name was a jocular corruption of the name of the innkeeper Jochum Fryck (–1714). The present name was not used in the 17th century, and the man in question was at his death associated with a tavern on Södermalm.

== See also ==
- List of streets and squares in Gamla stan
