= Banco =

Banco may refer to:

== Places ==
- Banc (Barcelona Metro), also called Banco, a closed metro stop on the Barcelona metro
- Banco, West Virginia, an unincorporated community
- Banco National Park, a national park in Côte d'Ivoire
- Banco Inglés, an underwater shoal in the Rio de la Plata

== Arts and architecture ==
- Banco (Banco del Mutuo Soccorso album), 1975 album by Italian progressive rock band Banco del Mutuo Soccorso
- Banco (Sir Michael Rocks album), 2014 album by American rapper Sir Michael Rocks
- Banco (novel), 1972 autobiography by Henri Charrière
- Banco architecture, a West African type of mudbrick, and the architecture made with it
- Banco (building material); fermented mud; made by fermenting mud with rice husks
- Banco (typeface), a decorative typeface
- Banco, an alternate Spanish spelling of bangka (boat) of the Philippines
- Banco, another name for the parlor game Bunco
- Banco, part of the nomenclature of the game known commonly as Baccarat

== Other ==
- Banco, a historical reference to the Bank of Sweden and Swedish coinage

== See also ==
- Banc, a word used in certain contexts instead of "bank"
- Banko (disambiguation)
