= Södra Bankogränd =

Alley in Gamla stan, Stockholm, Sweden

Coordinates: 59°19′21″N 18°04′26″E

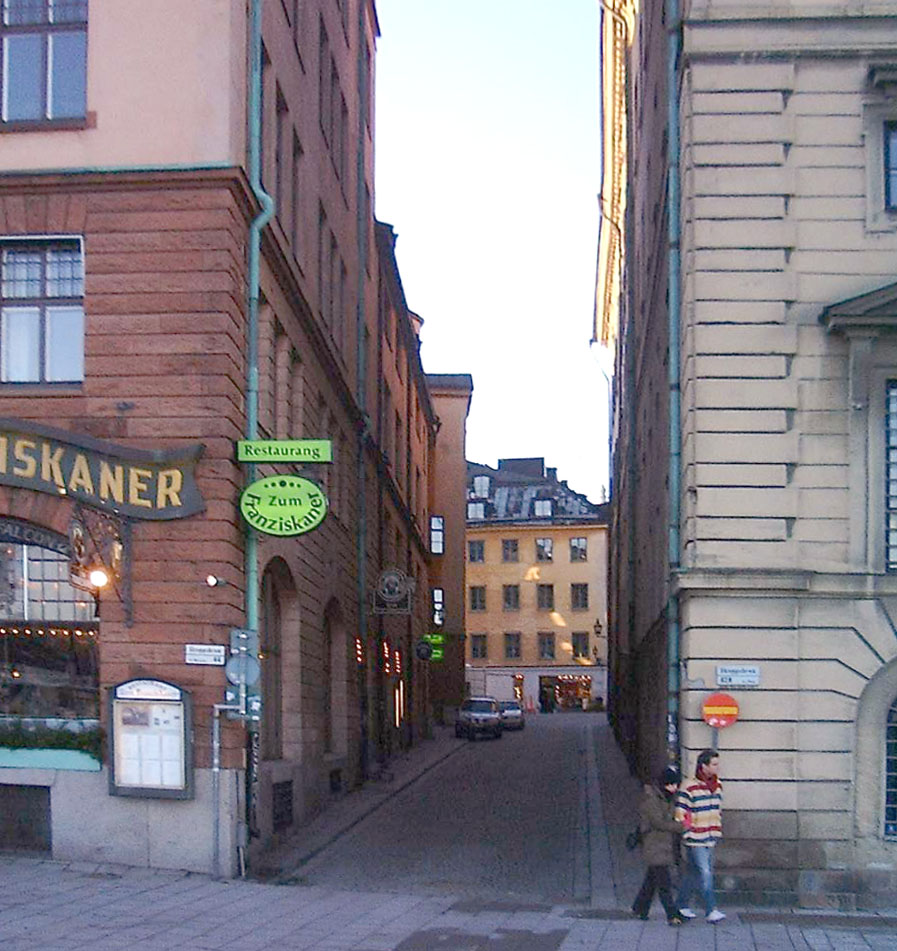
Södra Bankgränd in February 2007.

Södra Bankogränd (Swedish: "Southern Bank Alley") is an alley in Gamla stan, the old town of Stockholm, Sweden. Connecting Skeppsbron to Österlånggatan and Järntorget, it forms a parallel street to Norra Bankogränd and Norra Dryckesgränd.

Historically known as Banco-gränden (1729) and Södra Bancogränd (1733), the historic cobblestones were renovated in 2001. The alley passes south of Södra Bankohuset, the former building of the Bank of Sweden, first constructed by the architect Nicodemus Tessin the Elder (1615–1684) during the period 1666–1682. The part of the building facing Skeppsbron was later rebuilt, and the bank moved to Helgeandsholmen in 1906.

== See also ==
- List of streets and squares in Gamla stan
