= Killing of Banko Brown =

Killing of homeless man

- Date: April 27, 2023
- Participants: Michael Earl-Wayne Anthony

On April 27, 2023, Banko Brown, a homeless 24-year-old transgender man, was shot and killed outside of a Walgreens store in San Francisco by an on-duty security guard. Banko allegedly spit on the security guard and raised his arm toward him before being shot.

== People involved ==
=== Banko Brown ===
Banko Brown was a 24-year-old transgender man, living in San Francisco. Brown was a volunteer organizer at the Young Women's Freedom Center, a nonprofit organization that provides resources for transgender youth and young women. Brown had been homeless since he was 12 years old.

=== Michael Earl-Wayne Anthony ===
Michael Earl-Wayne Anthony was 33 years old and working as a security guard at the time of Brown's killing. Anthony was seven inches (180 mm) taller and twenty pounds (9.1 kg) heavier than Brown.

== Incident ==
On April 27, 2023, around 6:30 PM, Walgreens security guard Michael Earl-Wayne Anthony confronted Brown inside of the drug store on suspicion of shoplifting $15 worth of candy. As Brown tried to exit the store, Anthony wrestled him to the ground. After a few moments, Anthony let Brown up, and Brown continued exiting the store, but then spit on the security guard and raised his arm towards Anthony, who drew his gun and shot Brown. Brown died at a nearby hospital later that evening. According to an anonymous source, Brown had threatened to stab Anthony as they were wrestling on the ground. Brown was unarmed during the incident.

== Investigations and aftermath ==
Following the shooting, Anthony was arrested on suspicion of murder. District Attorney Brooke Jenkins did not issue a charge against Anthony, and he was released after one day. Jenkins said that security footage of the event showed that Anthony believed himself to be in danger, and acted out of self-defense.

On May 1, 2023, over a hundred protesters rallied outside of the Walgreens where Brown was killed, demanding an end to armed security and a larger public effort from the city to address transgender homelessness.

On May 2, 2023, following Jenkins’ statement that charges against Anthony would not be filed, supporters and family members of Brown demonstrated in a public Board of Supervisors meeting. They demanded that supervisors pressure Jenkins to file charges against Anthony, and that security footage of the incident be released to the public. Following the meeting, Board of Supervisor President Aaron Peskin said he would urge Jenkins to file charges. The following day, the Board of Supervisors unanimously voted on a resolution demanding the DA release security footage to the public.

Demonstrations continued on Sunday, May 7, near the site of the killing, causing delays to public transit in the city. Following the demonstrations, State Senator Scott Wiener called for the public release of security footage and other information, saying the new details released about the case introduced "significant public doubt" about claims of self-defense.

On May 8, 2023, protestors gathered outside of a local café where Jenkins was scheduled to appear on a panel; the panel was canceled. Jenkins released a statement on the same day, indicating that her office could still file charges, pending the result of an ongoing investigation.

Jenkins' office released surveillance footage of the shooting on May 15. Jenkins again refused to file charges against Anthony, saying that there was "insufficient evidence". She cited Anthony's statements alleging that Brown had threatened to stab him, though other witness accounts did not substantiate this and no knife was found at the scene. Jenkins stated that Brown appeared to be "lunging" at Anthony at the moment of the shooting, justifying "a reasonable, though in hindsight mistaken, belief that Brown posed an imminent threat". The Brown family attorney John Burris stated his intent to file a lawsuit.

On May 16, 2023, the San Francisco Board of Supervisors called for a review of the fatal shooting of Brown by state Attorney General Rob Bonta and the U.S. Department of Justice. The board, led by President Aaron Peskin, accused District Attorney Brooke Jenkins of depriving the communities of needed justice by deciding not to press charges. On May 23, Bonta's office announced that they would review the District Attorney's decision, and determine if there had been an abuse of discretion. A year later, on June 7, 2024, the California Attorney General’s Office sent a letter to the San Francisco Board of Supervisors indicating that it had concluded its review and could not say that such abuse had occurred.

Separately, in July 2023, the California Bureau of Security and Investigative Services fined Anthony $1,500 for violations of its uniform and firearm regulations. The security company that employed him, Kingdom Group Protective Services, was fined $5,000 for failing to provide an incident report in a timely fashion.
