= O'Learys =

Swedish franchising restaurant chain

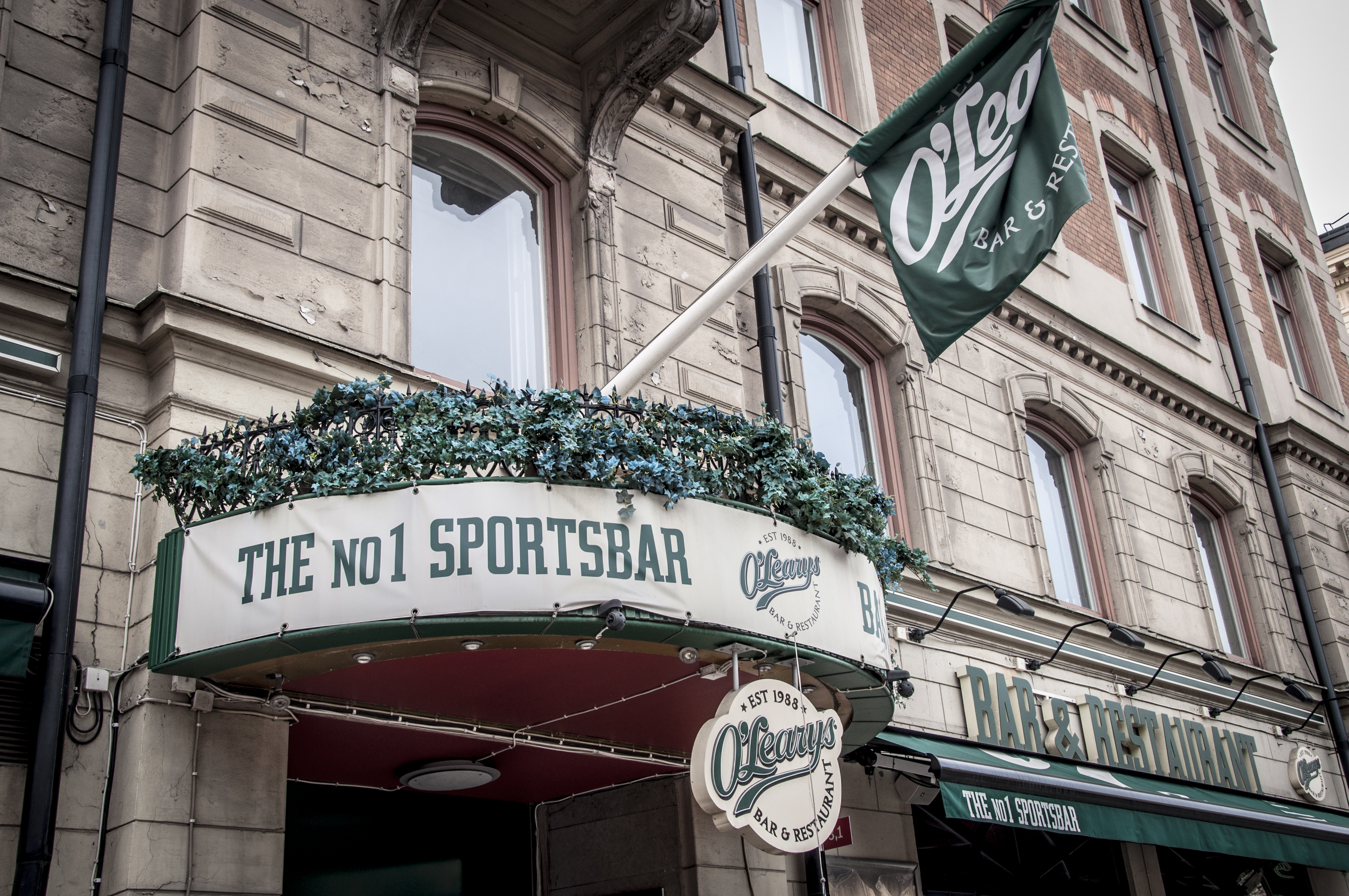
An O'Learys restaurant in Norrmalm, Stockholm, Sweden.

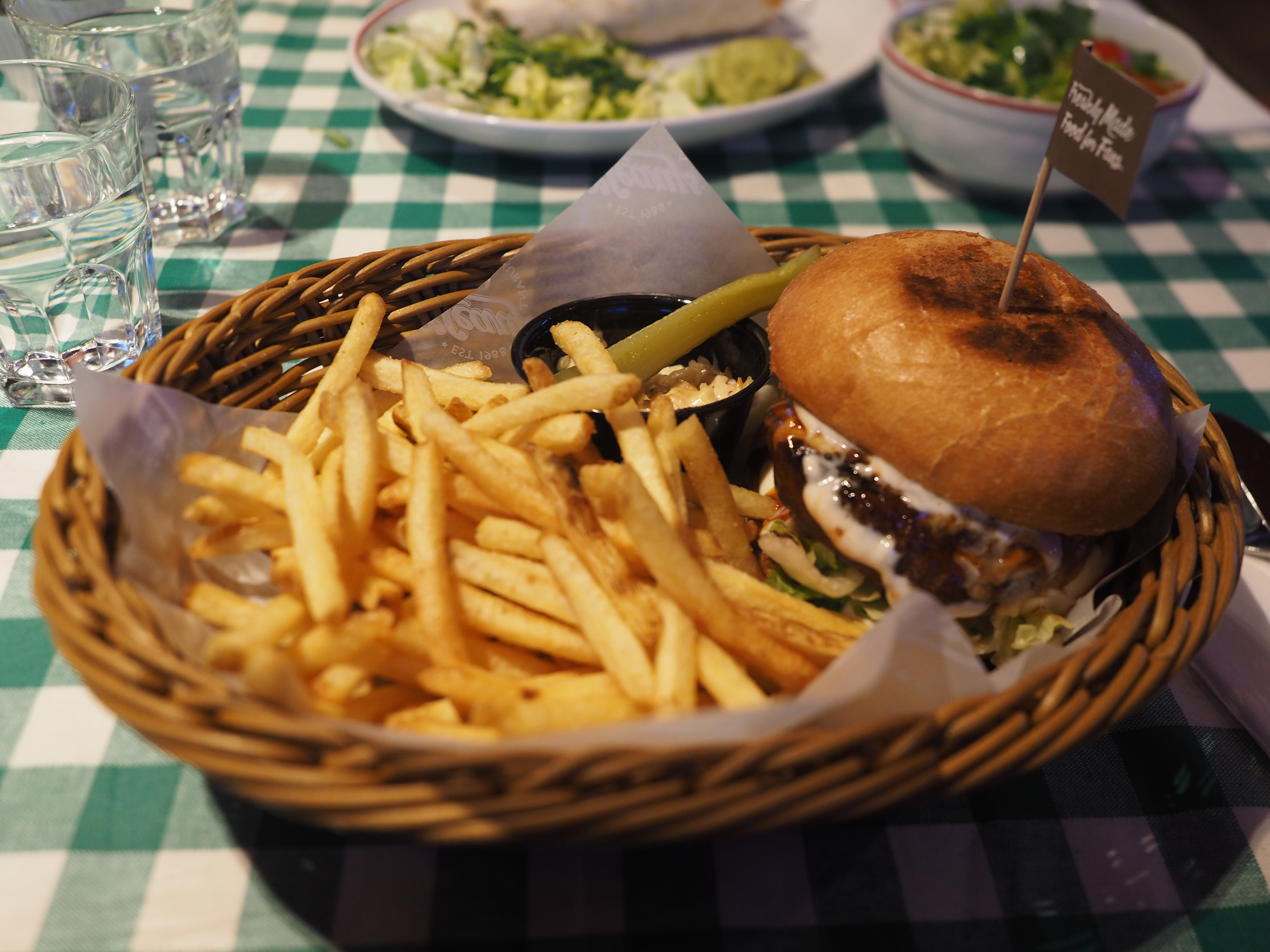
A hamburger at an O'Learys restaurant in Helsinki, Finland.

O'Learys is a Swedish franchising restaurant chain modelled after the concept of an American sports bar and restaurant.

== History ==
The chain was founded by Jonas Reinholdsson and Anne O'Leary and the first restaurant was opened in Gothenburg on 16 November 1988 at Basarsgatan 10.

Reinholdsson was working at a sports bar in Boston and took a liking to the local mix of people, food and drink. One day Reinholdsson and O'Leary met and fell in love. After the couple moved to Reinholdsson's home country Sweden they decided to found a Boston-style bar. The bar was a great success, and the chain has since expanded a lot.

== Overall ==
O'Learys was the first real American sports bar in Sweden. This type of restaurant can be found all over the United States, such as Boston, New York, Chicago and San Francisco. The restaurants often have green walls full of memorabilia of local sports stars, in the case of O'Learys sports stars from Boston.

As of December 2017, the chain has a total of 126 restaurants in 16 countries, including Sweden, Norway, Denmark, Finland, Estonia, Iceland, Lithuania, Belgium, Spain, Hungary, The Netherlands, Turkey, United Arab Emirates, China, Singapore and Vietnam.

Signs franchise contracts to enter the Estonian, Icelandic, Latvian and Russian markets.
