= Black Friars' Monastery of Stockholm =

Former Dominican monastery in Sweden

Coordinates: 59°19′24″N 18°4′24″E

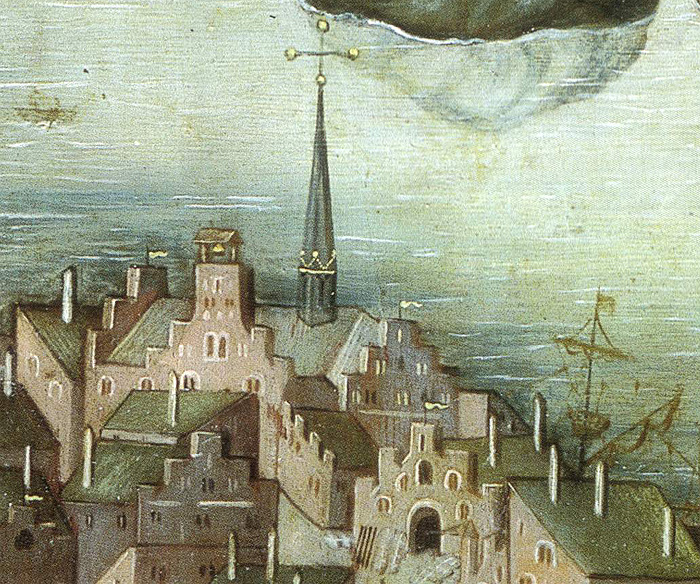
The Dominican church, Black Friars' Monastery in Stockholm

The Black Friars' Monastery, Svartbrödraklostret, also called the convent of Stockholm, was a Dominican monastery on the island of Stadsholmen (City Island) in central Stockholm, founded by King Magnus IV in 1336 when he donated a plot of land located in the southern part of Stadsholmen to the Black Friars. By order of Gustav Vasa the monastery was demolished in 1547, but some of the vaults are still preserved and can be visited. Today Svartmangatan (Blackman Street), which led down to the monastery, is still reminiscent of the Black Friars' era.

== History ==
=== Arrival of the friars ===
The Black Friars or Dominicans, as they were also called, was a mendicant order founded by Saint Dominic in 1216. The name 'Black Brothers' refers to the friar's style of dress, wearing black, hooded robes. In 1220, the friars came to Sweden to build convents in Sigtuna and Strängnäs. They soon sought a plot of land to construct a homeless shelter, or abbey, also in Stockholm, and found a suitable piece of land at the southern bridge between Stadsholmen and Södermalm. But the king's vogt at Three Crowns Castle declared that property unlawful for them. According to another source, the friars bought a house at the southern bridge in 1289, where they lived during their trips to Stockholm.

=== Researching the Venus quarter ===
It was not until the year 1337 that this issue was resolved. The recently crowned King Magnus IV donated one of his crown lands, located inside the old thirteenth century city walls at today's Prästgatan–Österlånggatan, to the Black Friars. The following year he also gave a larger sum of money to the Black Friars, but the monastery could not be built until Pope Clement VI issued a permit in 1343. The reason for the delay was discord between him and the friars in Strängnäs. Toward the end of the fourteenth century, the monastery had already acquired certain fame.

In 1359, according to some historians, the young Swedish queen Beatrix of Bavaria and her newborn son were buried in the cloister of the monastery, as was Queen Richardis in 1377.

The monastery was destroyed by a severe fire that hit Stadsholmen in the year 1407, and some of the friars were even killed in the blaze. In a short period, the monastery was rebuilt, bigger and more beautiful than before. The new monastery was Stockholm's largest and played a political role in the city at that time. It was here that Charles Knutsson (the future King Charles II) was appointed Rikshövitsman (Kingdom Captain) during the Engelbrekt rebellion of 1436, and Sten Sture the Elder took office as Riksföreståndare (Regent) in 1501. After the Siege of Tre Kronor (castle) on 9 May 1502, the defeated Queen, Christina of Saxony, was kept prisoner here by Sten Sture the Elder.

In 1929 the antiquarian and later City Curator Tord O: son Nordberg conducted a comprehensive examination and measurement of the blocks Venus and Juno. He found remains of medieval walls indicating, as he saw it, a likelihood that the monastery buildings for the most part had been in the Venus block and the church in the neighbouring Juno block. It is assumed that the monastery basement during the late Middle Ages was leased to a wine merchant to serve as a local restaurant with direct entrance from the street, but without access to the monastery itself.

=== Demolition of the monastery ===
In 1528 Gustav Vasa had the monastery demolished, but the church and a few rows of houses remained. As first described in 1547, the building material for the monastery was used for the reconstruction of Three Crowns Castle. In Stockholm, the tänkebok (protocol books held at the Municipal Court in the cities during the Middle Ages and in the 1500s) of 6 June 1547 reads: Anno dni 1547. Dhå brótz swartmunka klóster nidher i grundh och fórdis tiill slottet. (Anno Domini 1547 when the black brothers' monastery was brought to the ground and taken to the castle.)

There are still two basement rooms with seven majestic brick arches at southern Benickebrinken, and four next to Österlånggatan in Gamla stan, which originally were supposed to have been used as a shelter for wayfarers and pilgrims. These basement rooms are managed by the Museum of Medieval Stockholm.

== Gallery ==
Pictures of the Black Friars' Monastery of Stockholm
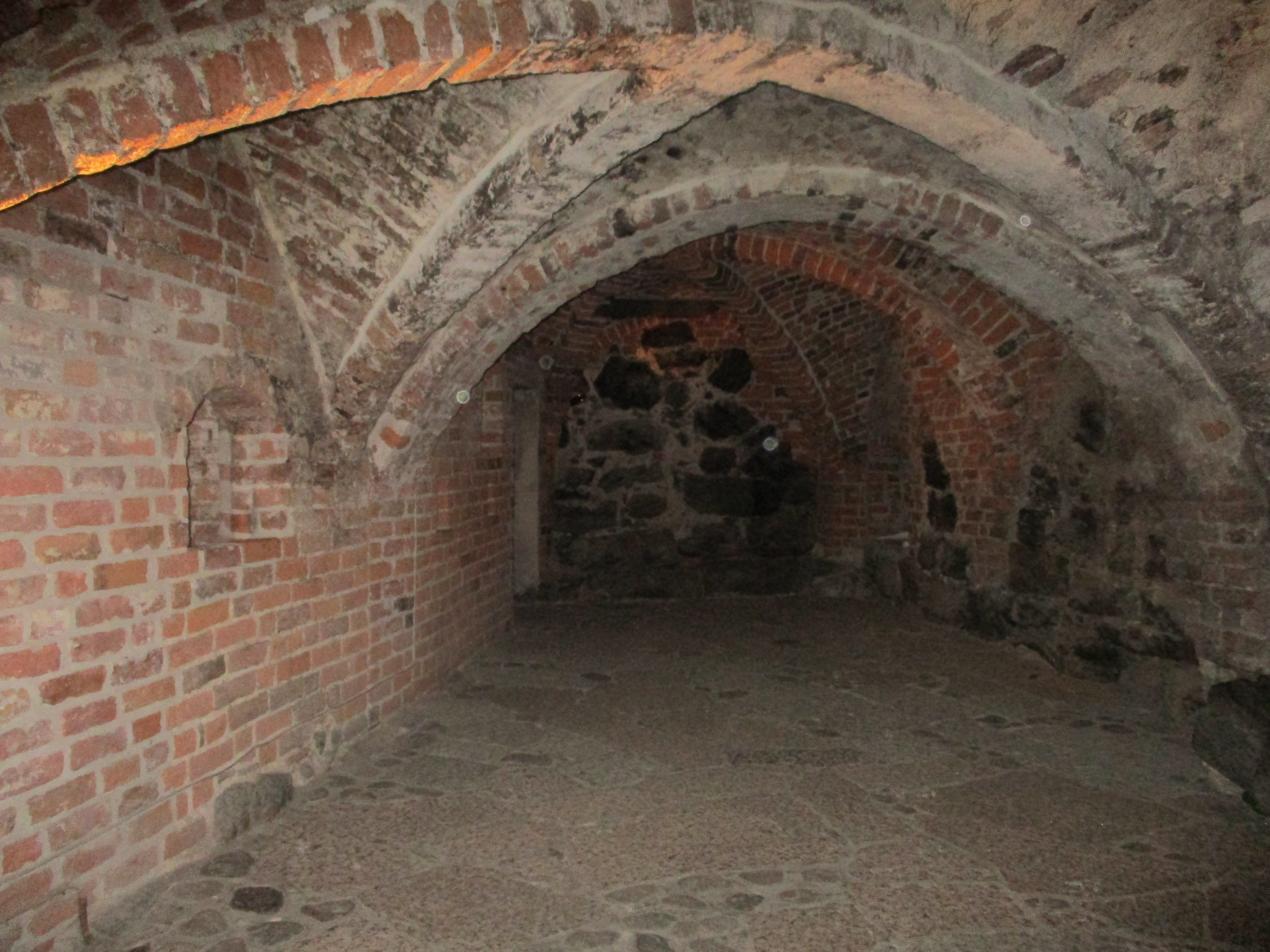
Vaults under the Black Friars' Monastery, Old Town, Stockholm.

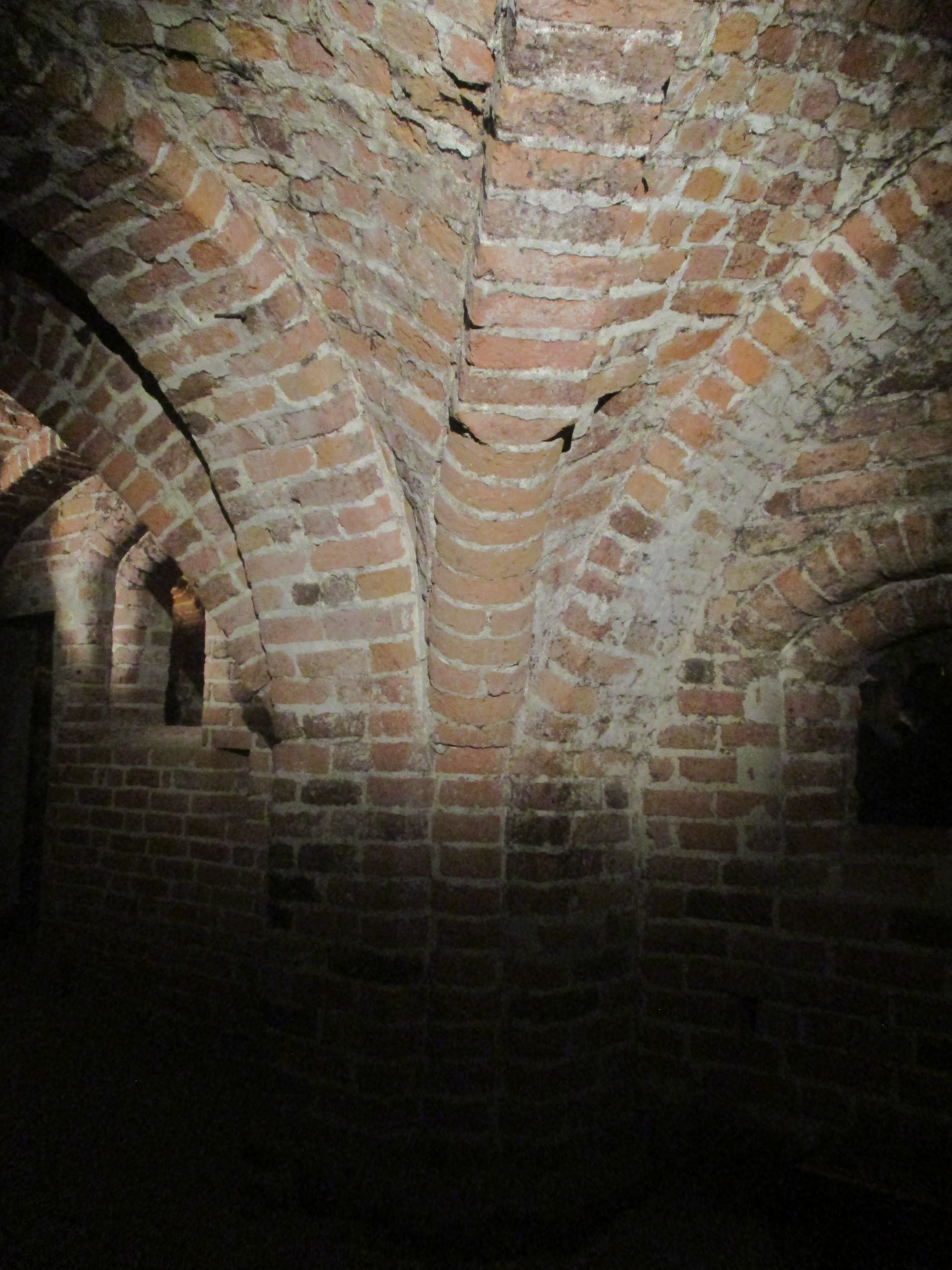
Brickwork in the vaults under the Black Friars' Monastery, Old Town, Stockholm.

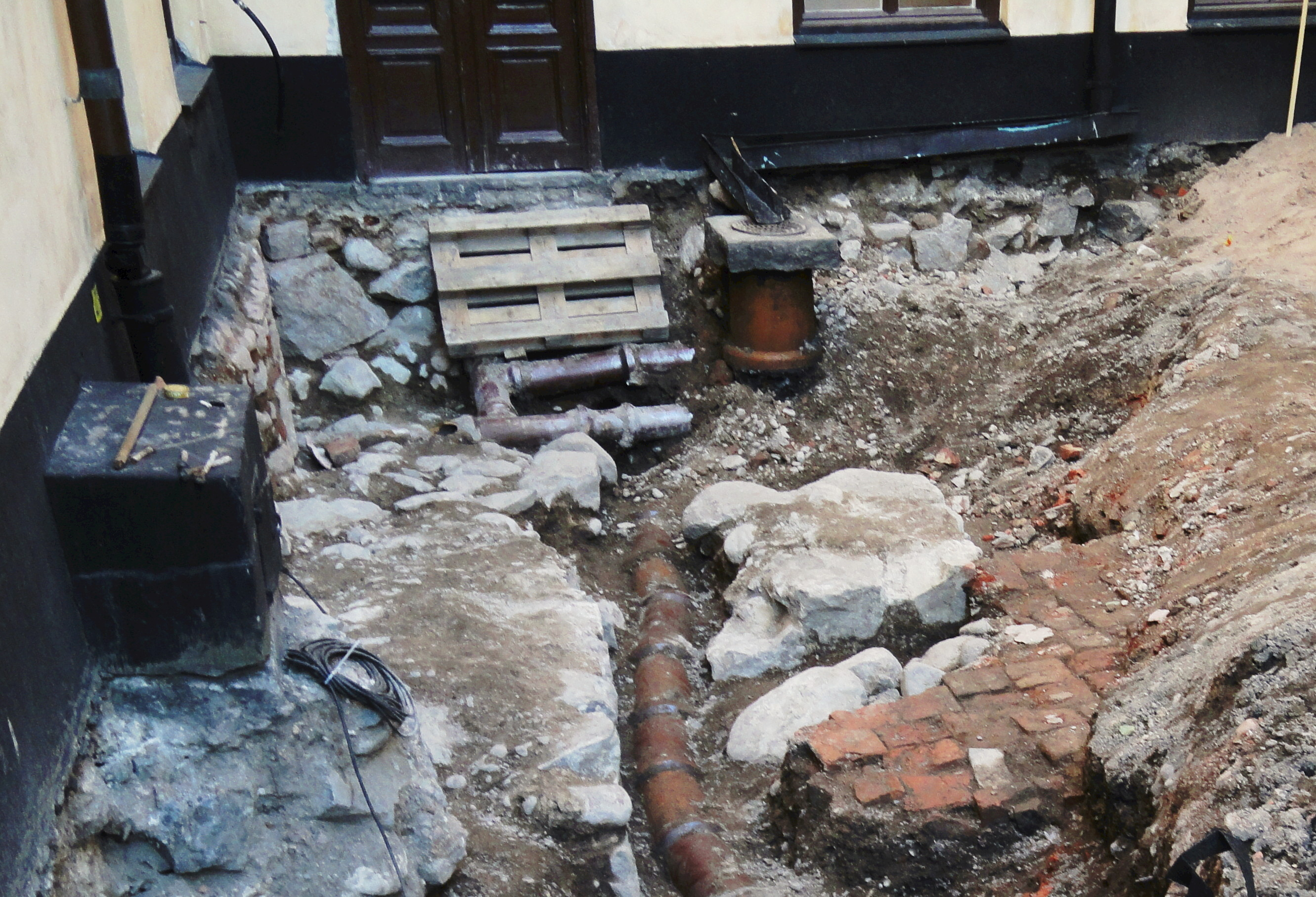
A front dug brick floor in the Venus quarter in Old Town. The floor appears to have been part of the Dominican monastery that existed at the site up to approximately 1540.

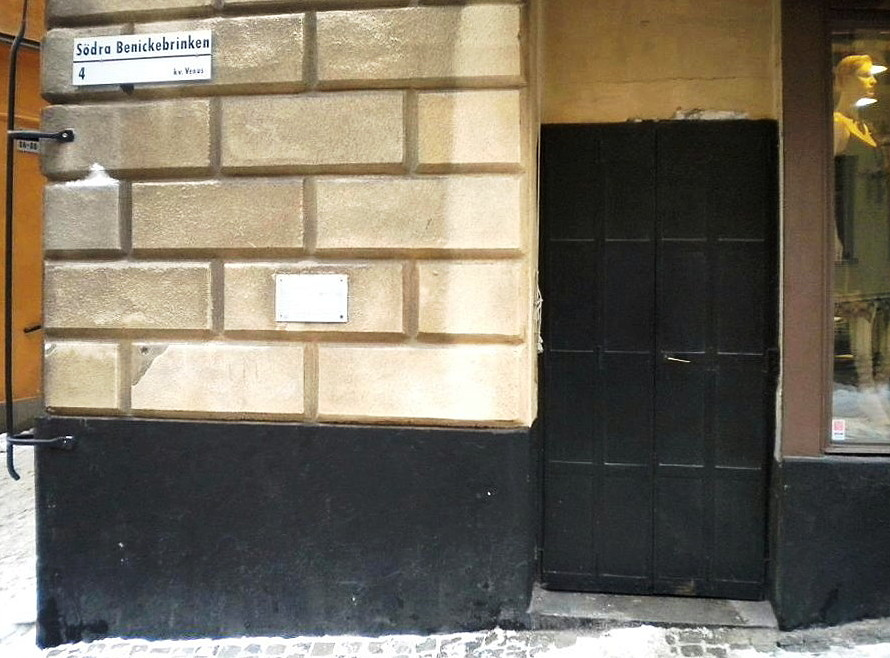
Door to the cellar remnants of the Black Friars' Monastery, burial place (farther north) of Queen Beatrice and Richardis.

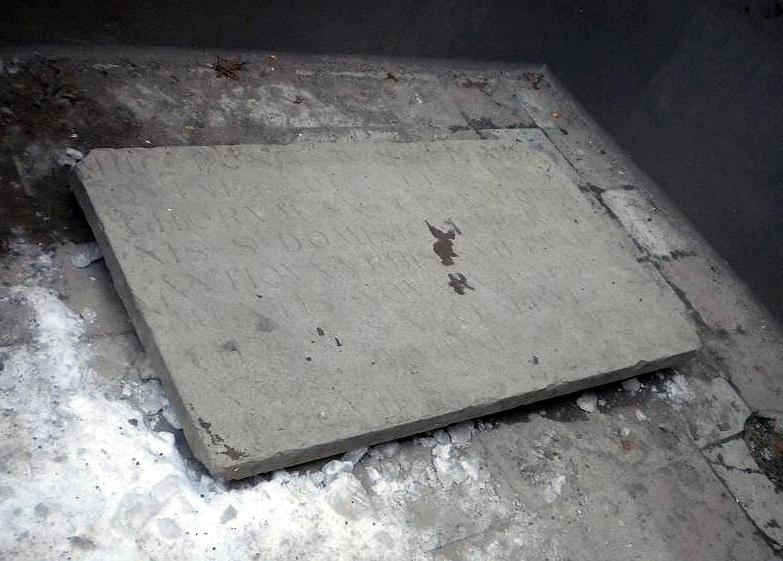
Memorial stone with Latin text honoring those buried at Black Friars' Cloister

== Notes ==
- This article is based on the translation of the corresponding article of the Swedish Wikipedia. A list of contributors can be found there at the History section.

== Sources ==
- Dahlbäck, Goran (1995)
- Friman, Helena (2008)
- Ohlmarks, Ake (1953)
