= Fru Gunillas gränd =

Alley in Gamla stan, Stockholm, Sweden

Coordinates: 59°19′24.6″N 18°04′4.3″E

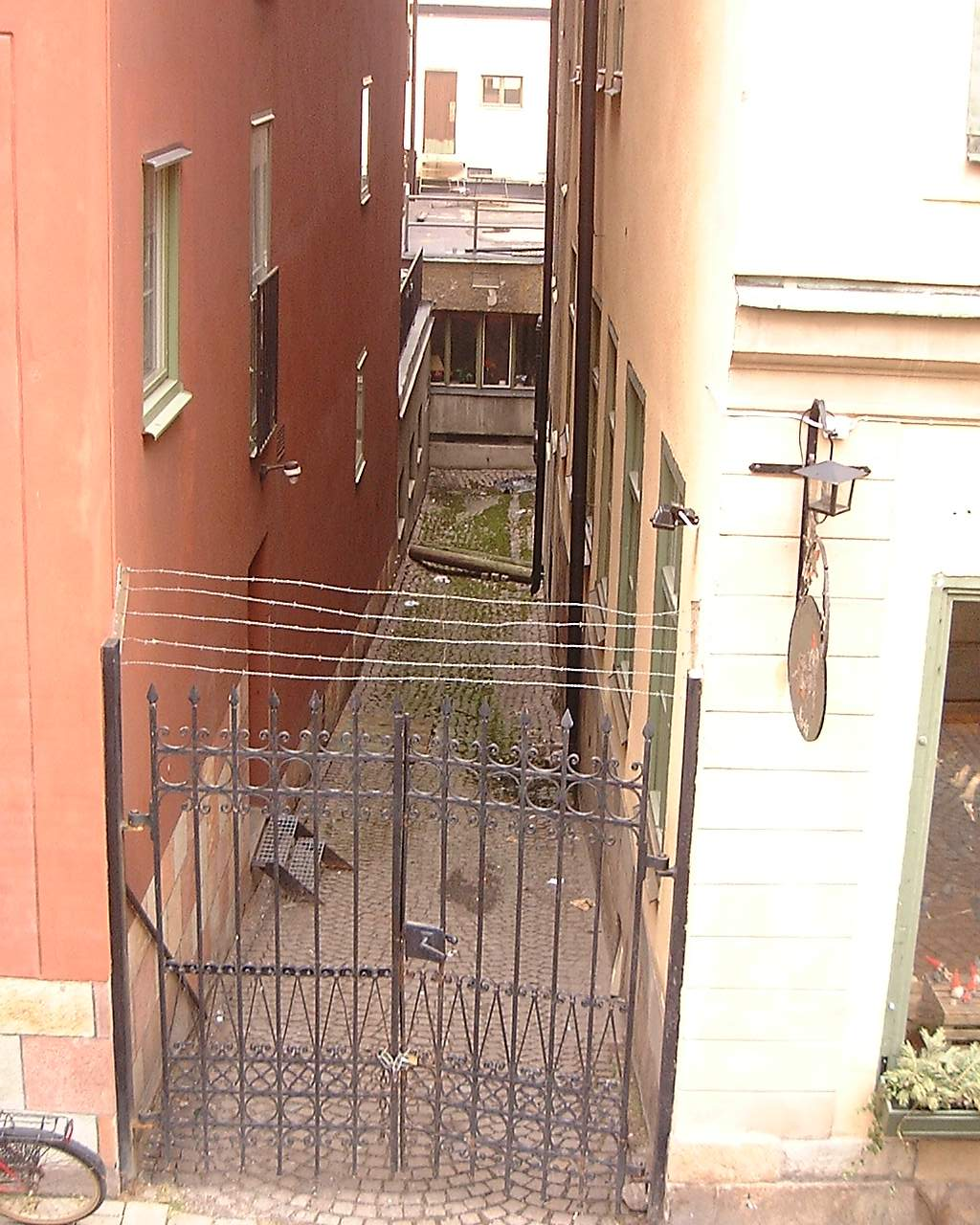
Fru Gunillas gränd viewed from Benickebrinken.

Fru Gunillas gränd (Swedish: Alley of Mrs. Gunilla) is a historical alley in Gamla stan, the old town in central Stockholm, Sweden, once connecting Skeppsbron to Österlånggatan between Johannesgränd and Packhusgränd.

In the old town, minor passages between properties, especially those located just outside the old city wall, were often shut off by adjacent proprietors to be used as back-yards and filled with heaps of rubbish, and were frequently the subject for lengthy legal proceedings between proprietors and the city during the 17th century. While some of these alleys, such as Mårten Trotzigs Gränd, today the narrowest alley in the old town, was reopened in 1945, Fru Gunillas Gränd remains closed. During the 15th, 16th, and 17th centuries, it was open in both ends, thereafter closed off towards Skeppsbron, and, judging from its absence on a map dated 1733, then sealed off in both ends.

The alley was known as Doktor Belows gränd during the end of the 17th century, probably in reference to a major proprietor in the block constantly disputing the use of the alley with his neighbours. It is most likely the alley named Herr Henning Pinnows gränd ("Alley of Mr. Henning Pinnow") and Herr Måns Erikssons gränd ("Alley of Mr. Måns Eriksson") in the 15th century, the former known to have sold a house to the latter in 1472. In 1513, the alley was then named after Gunilla Johansdotter Bese (1473–1553), wife of Erik Turesson Bielke (-1511) and mother to the grandfather of Queen Gunilla Bielke (1568–1597), and in 1674 the alley was even referred to as Sancta Gunillas gränd ("Alley of St Gunilla").

== See also ==
- List of streets and squares in Gamla stan
