= Tullgränd =

Alley in Gamla stan, Stockholm, Sweden

Coordinates: 59°19′23″N 18°04′26″E

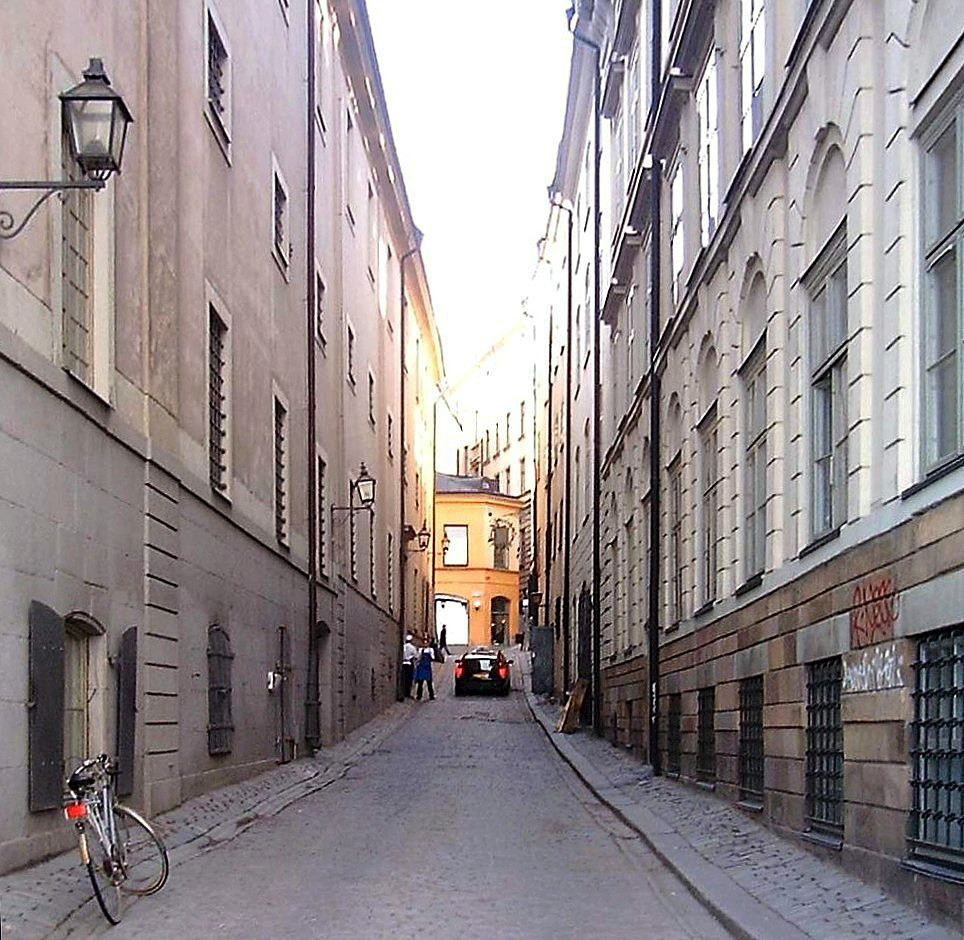
Tullgränd in April 2007.

Tullgränd (Swedish: "Customs Alley") is an alley in Gamla stan, the old town of Stockholm, Sweden, connecting Skeppsbron to Österlånggatan. It forms a parallel street to Packhusgränd and Norra Bankogränd.

The alley appears in historical records as Tollhuus grenden in 1626, stora Tullhus gränden in 1693, Store Siötullsgränden in 1704, Stora Tull gr[änd] in 1733, and finally as Tullgränd in 1885. The name is derived from Tullhuset ("the Customs Building") located in the block north of the alley in 1686, and the warehouse built in the 1780s. By the early 18th century, the alley was known as Solgränden ("The Sun Alley") after the tavern Lilla Solen ("The Small Sun") which was located there (see also Packhusgränd and Solgränd.)

== See also ==
- List of streets and squares in Gamla stan
