= Stora Hoparegränd =

Alley in Gamla stan, Stockholm, Sweden

Coordinates: 59°19′29″N 18°04′30″E

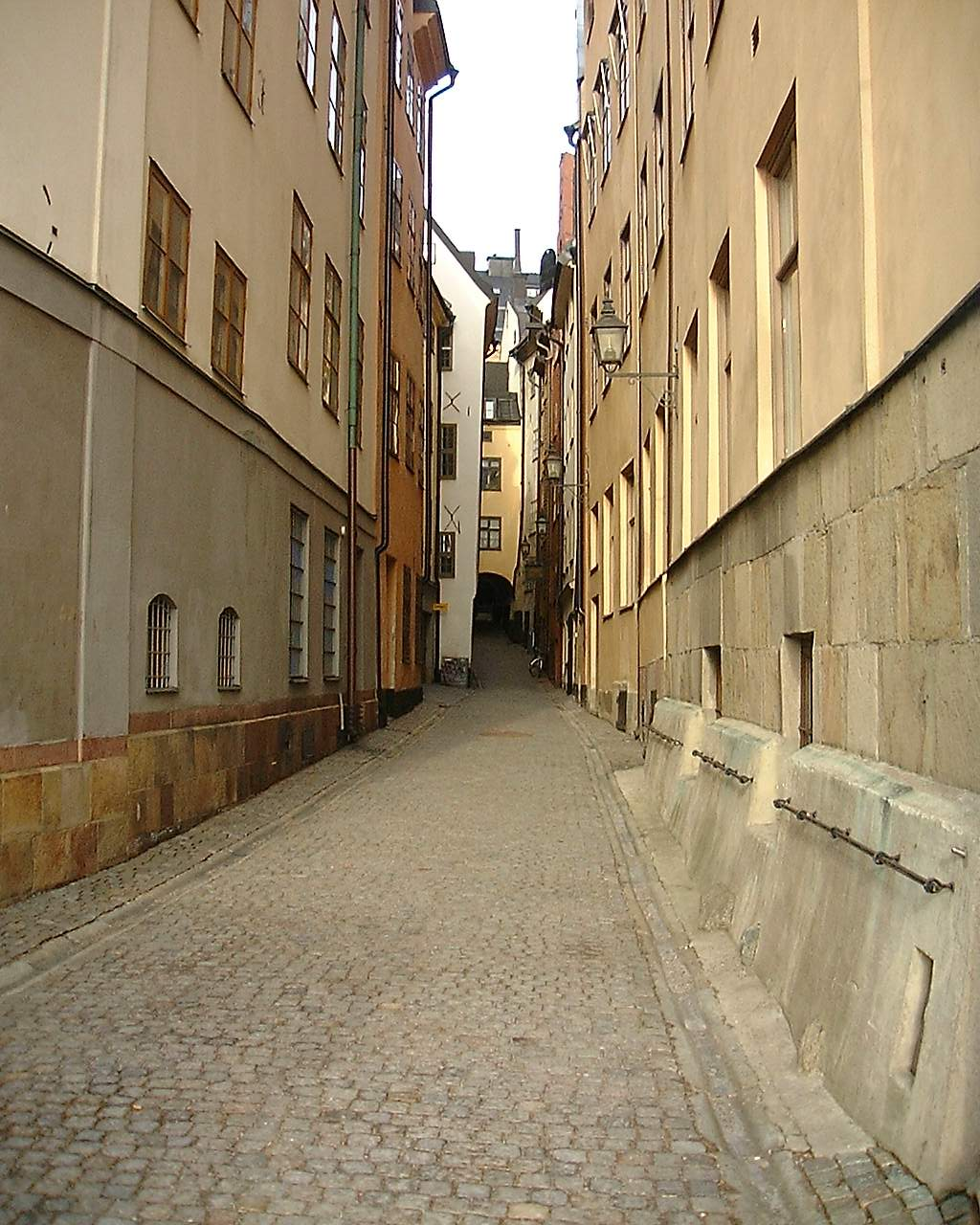
Stora Hoparegränd in April 2007.

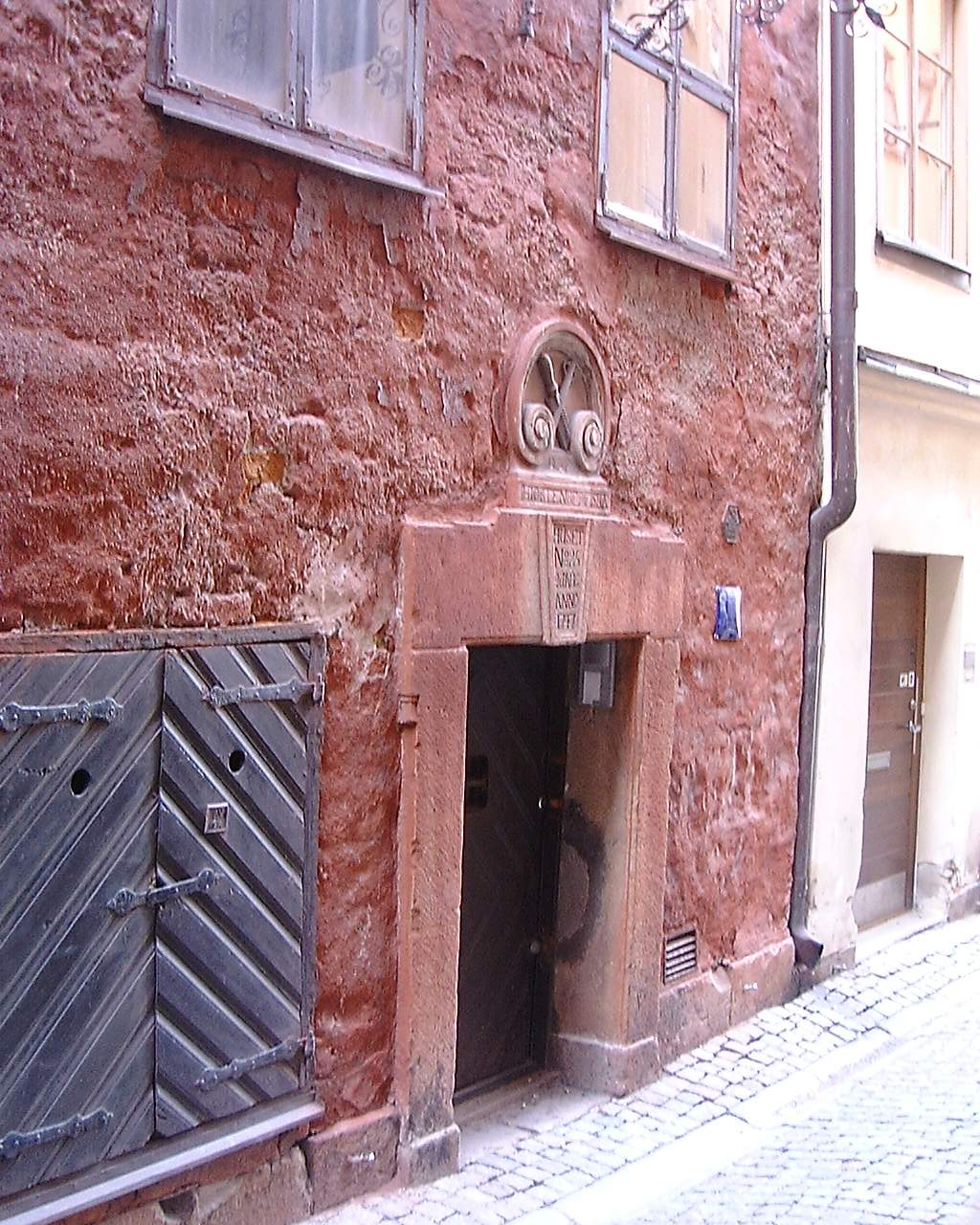
Gate of number 6, the door is about 1,5 metres tall.

Stora Hoparegränd is an alley in Gamla stan, the old town of Stockholm, Sweden. Connecting Skeppsbron to Österlånggatan, it forms a parallel street to Skottgränd and Drakens gränd.

It appears in historical records as Mechiill hopares grennd (1550), Hopers grändh (1578), Michel Hopers grendh (1582) and St. Hopare gr[änd] (1733).

Hoparegränd is named after a Michel Hoper (or Hopare) who owned a property in the alley during the first half of the 16th century. Hoper's widow, Brita, handed the property over to the husband of her niece in 1566 in exchange for sustenance. The name is of Dutch or Frisian origin, and as a surname it gives an indication of a profession, hooper (e.g. maker of barrels).

A film, Stora Hoparegränd och himmelriket ("Stora Hoparegränd and Heaven") was released in 1949.

== See also ==
- List of streets and squares in Gamla stan
- Lilla Hoparegränd
