= Drakens Gränd =

Alley in Gamla stan, Stockholm, Sweden

Coordinates: 59°19′28.0″N 18°04′29.1″E

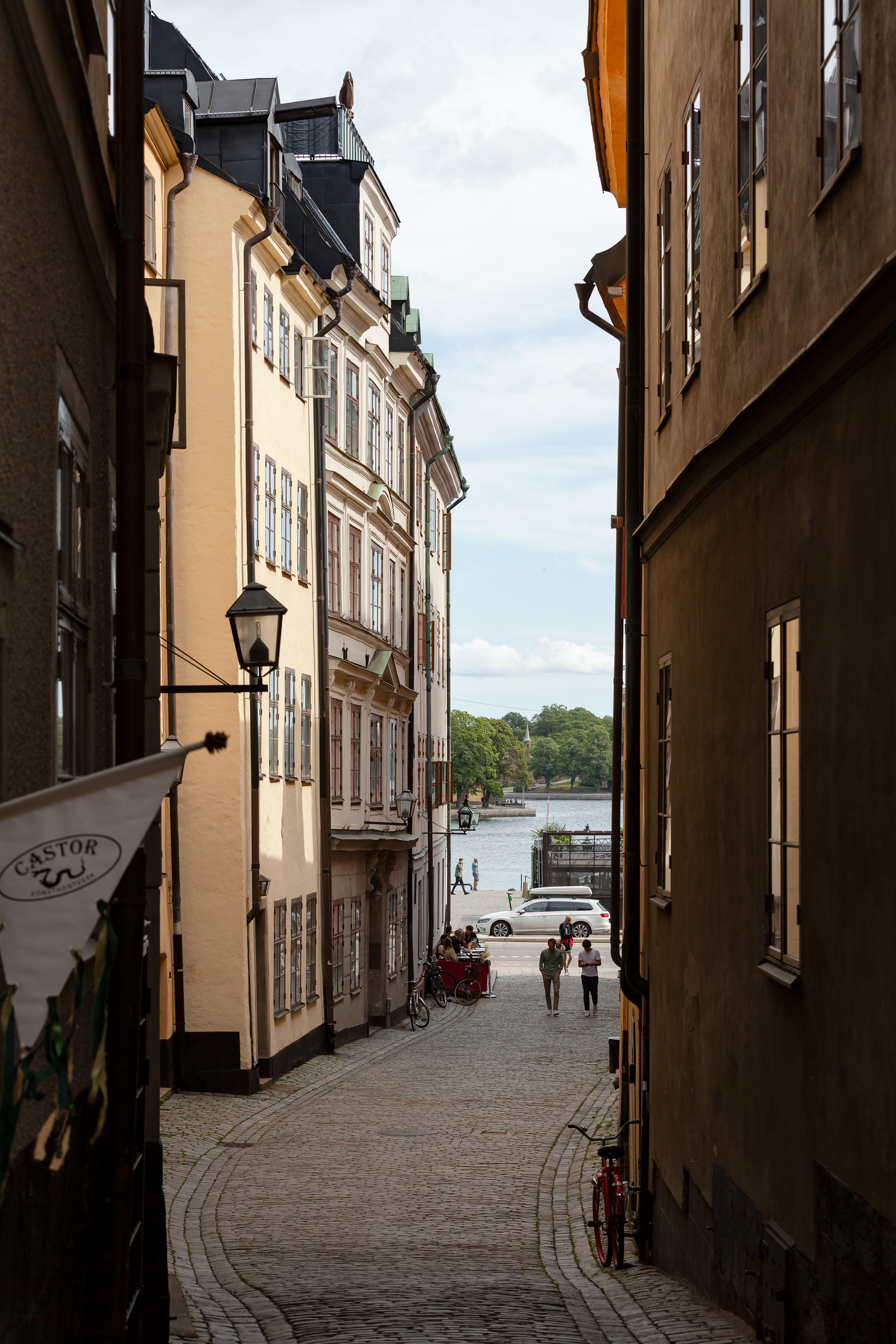
Drakens gränd in 2019

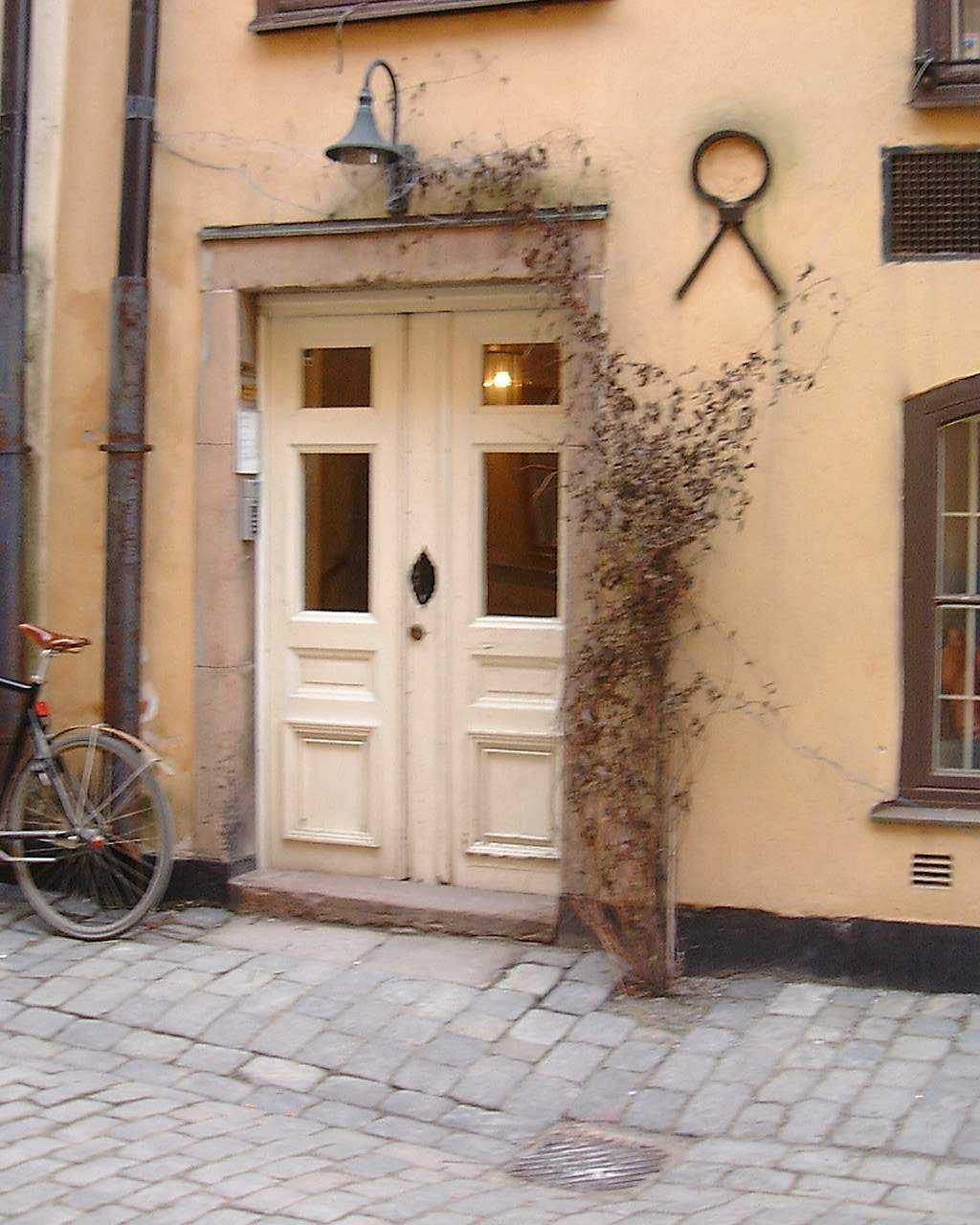
The portal and wall anchor of Number 6.

Drakens gränd is an alley in Gamla stan, the old town of Stockholm, Sweden. Stretching from Skeppsbron to Österlånggatan, it forms a parallel street to Stora Hoparegränd and Ferkens Gränd.

It appears in historical records as Bredgränd (?), brede gränden (?), Makelerens gränd (17th century, after a Jacob Mac Leer), Bergsgränd (1686), Drakens gr[änd] (1728), Skultans gränd (?)

The alley is named after the tavern Draken ("The Dragon") once found in the western end of the street. During the 1660s it was owned by a Melchior Schipman; in 1682 bought by Jöran Berg and renamed Förgyllda Draken ("Gilded Dragon"); and finally discontinued after the latter's death in 1722.

The proletarian author Erik Asklund (1908–1980) wrote the novel Drakens gränd in 1965 as part of a trilogy.

Drakens gränd is also the name of a company owned by King Carl XVI Gustav (1946-). The company appeared in Swedish media in early 2006, as a property in the alley owned by the king featured in transactions for which the king was accused of tax avoidance.

== See also ==
- List of streets and squares in Gamla stan
