= Lilla Hoparegränd =

Alley in Gamla stan, Stockholm, Sweden

Coordinates: 59°19′26.8″N 18°04′27.3″E

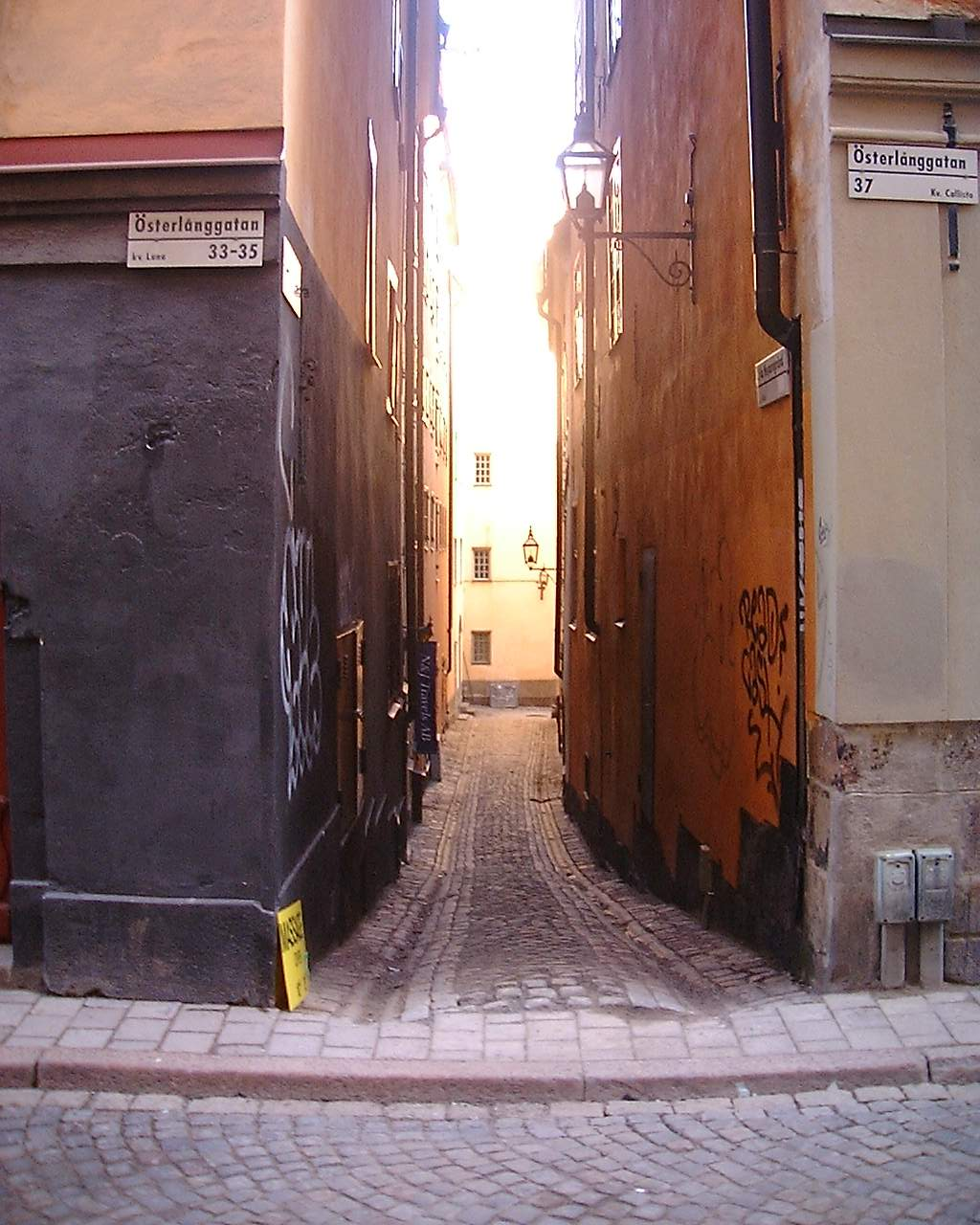
Lilla Hopare Gränd in March 2007

Lilla Hoparegränd is an alley in Gamla stan, the old town of Stockholm, Sweden. Passing between Skeppsbron and Österlånggatan it forms a parallel street to Ferkens Gränd, Gaffelgränd, Pelikansgränd and Johannesgränd.

The street appears in historical records as Wargzfrenden in 1550, Warge Grenden in 1646, Vargsgränden during the 16th-17th centuries and finally as Lilla Hopare gr. in 1771. Why the alley was originally called Varggränd ("Wolf Alley") is not known, however, Varg is still a common proper name in Sweden and might refer to an individual associated with the alley. The present name refers to a Michel Hoper or Hopare. Hoper is of Dutch or Frisian origin and means hooper (e.g. maker of barrels).

== See also ==
- List of streets and squares in Gamla stan
- Stora Hoparegränd
- Pelikansgränd
- Gaffelgränd
