= Ferkens Gränd =

Alley in Gamla stan, Stockholm, Sweden

Coordinates: 59°19′27.3″N 18°04′29.0″E

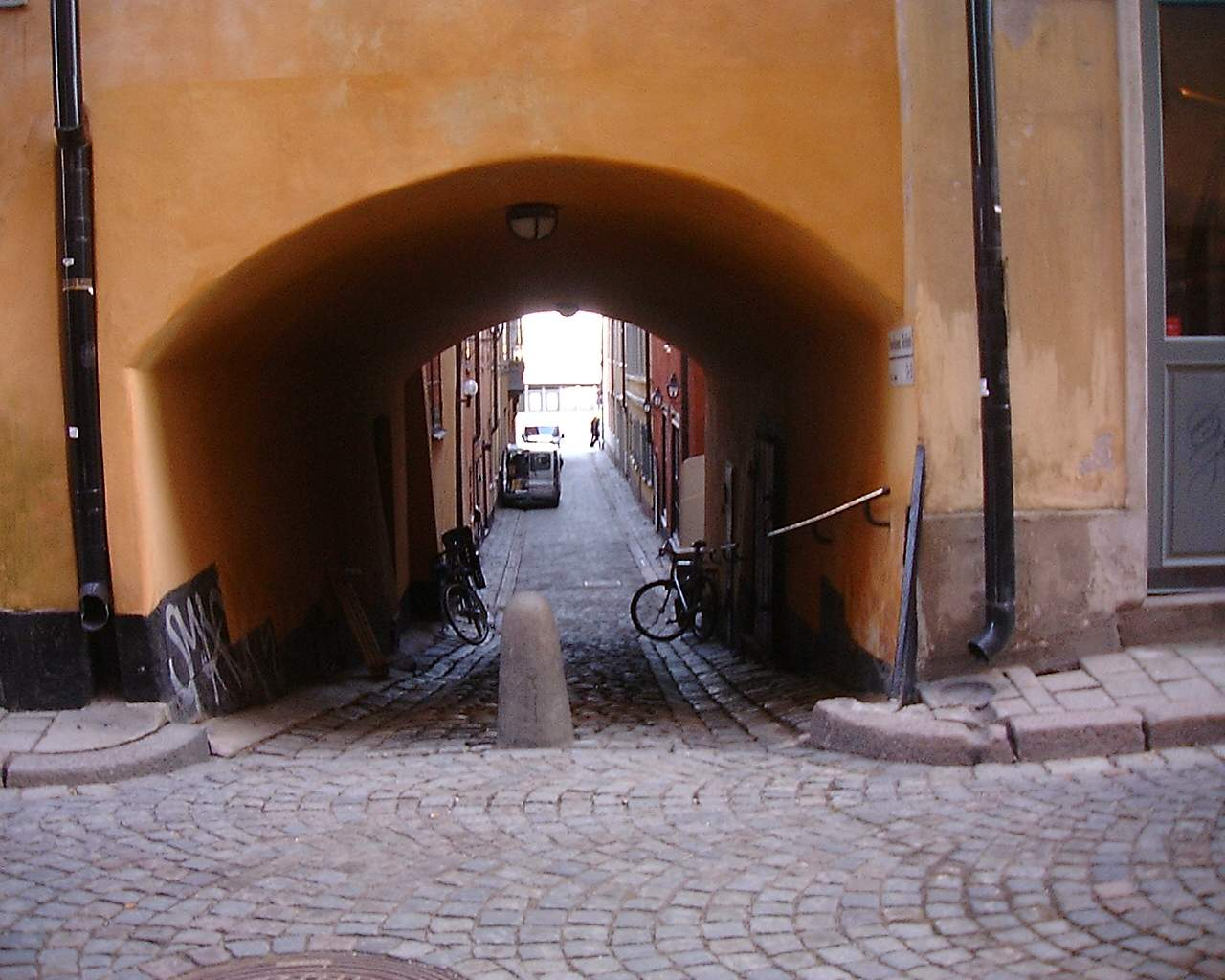
Western vault of Ferkens gränd in March 2007.

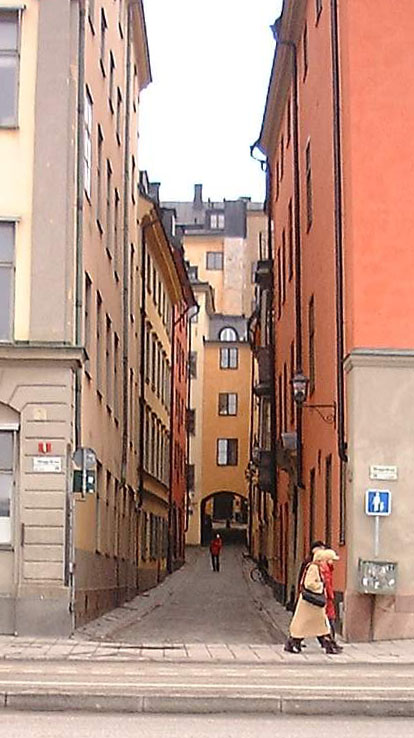
View from Skeppsbron.

Ferkens gränd (Swedish: Alley of Ferken) is an alley in Gamla stan, the old town of Stockholm, Sweden, connecting Skeppsbron to Österlånggatan. It forms a parallel street to Drakens gränd, Lilla Hoparegränd, Pelikansgränd, and Gaffelgränd.

In appears in historical records as Ferkens grändh in 1619, Farkens grändh in 1621, and Bredgränd (?).The alley derives its name from a simple restaurant in the early 17th century found in the eastern end of the alley. It was called Farken or Ferken, a name derived from the German word Farch or Ferkel meaning 'pig', and it probably had a sign displaying a pig. A Leuisa i Farken ("Louise in the Fark") mentioned in 1602, was married to a Michill Wossin, who in June 1605 was allowed to run the tavern by King Charles IX. The establishment was however declared unfit in 1687 and the building demolished a few years later.

== Notes ==
1. A restaurant called a gårkök, a name derived from gar, a German word in the context meaning 'ready-made', and kök, 'kitchen' - e.g. a fast food restaurant.

== See also ==
- List of streets and squares in Gamla stan
