= Skottgränd =

Alley in Gamla stan, Stockholm, Sweden

Coordinates: 59°19′29.60″N 18°04′28.50″E

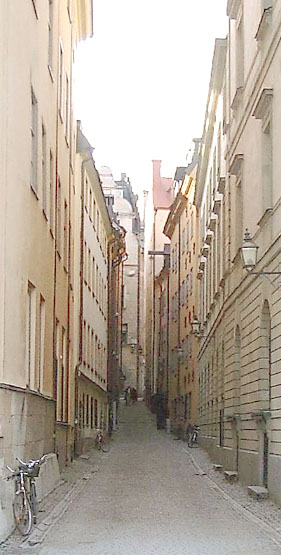
Skottgränd in March 2007.

Skottgränd (Swedish: "Scotch Alley") is an alley in Gamla stan, the old town of Stockholm Sweden, stretching from Skeppsbron to Österlånggatan.

Old names
Skottegrändenn (1597), østan till Skåttegrändhenn (1606)

Apparently the name came into use by the end of the 16th century. It reflects the immigration of Scots, Englishmen and Dutch people who settled in the alley and were, arguably, collectively referred to as 'Scots'. Possibly, the name might refer to the name of an individual, even though the records do not give any details about it.

Parallel streets
Brunnsgränd, Stora Hoparegränd
Crossing streets
Skeppsbron, Österlånggatan

== See also ==
- List of streets and squares in Gamla stan
