= Gaffelgränd =

Street in Gamla stan, Stockholm, Sweden

Coordinates: 59°19′26.2″N 18°04′29.6″E

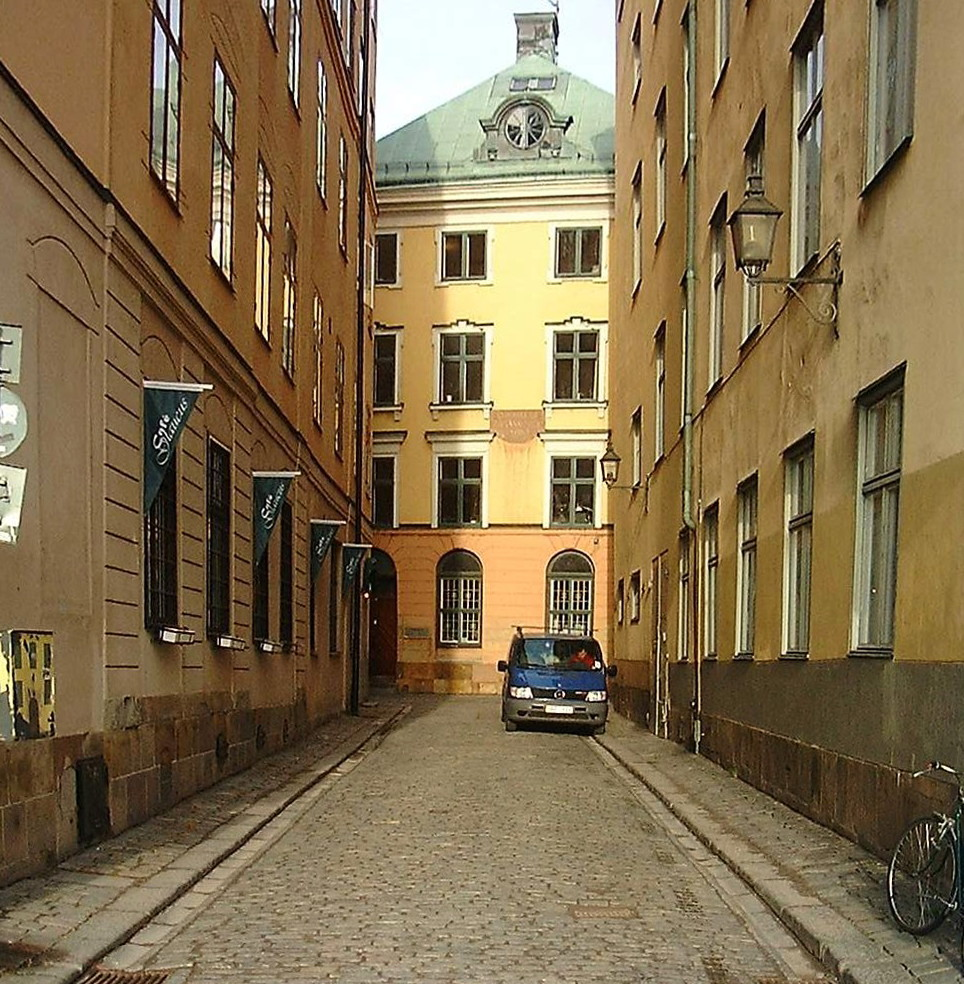
Gaffelgränd in April 2007.

Gaffelgränd is an alley in Gamla stan, the old town of Stockholm, Sweden, connecting Skeppsbron to Lilla Hoparegränd and Pelikansgränd, both of which are leading to Österlånggatan. It is a parallel street to Ferkens Gränd, Lilla Hoparegränd, Pelikansgränd, and Johannesgränd.

== History ==
The alley appears in historical records as Hopare Gränden in 1700, Gaffelgränden in 1720, and gafwel gränden in 1720. It came to being as the old city wall was demolished and Skeppsbron projected in the 1630s. The alleys leading east from Österlånggatan were then extended down to the new quay, of unknown reason with the exception of Lilla Hoparegränd and Pelikangränd. The two corner houses flanking Gaffelgränd were built instead, probably before 1647, and the alley created as a result.

== Etymology ==
The origin of the name is not entirely clear. In its old form (1720), Gavelgränd ("Gable Alley"), it might refer to the gable in the western end of the street viewable from Skeppsbron; or, as on a map dated 1733 and as its modern name implies, Gaffelgränd ("Fork Alley") might refer to the fork-like structure formed by the three alleys.

== In culture ==
In the dedications in his epistles, the troubadour Carl Michael Bellman (1740–1795), still popular for his devotion to wine and women, mentions the alley twice, or rather a tavern in it:

- In Epistle 5:

Till the trogne bröder på Terra Nova i Gaffelgränden
To the faithful brothers at 'Terra Nova' in The Fork Alley

- Epistle 18:

Till gubbarna på Terra Nova i Gaffelgränden vid Skeppsbron
To the old men at 'Terra Nova' in The Fork Alley at Skeppsbron

The alley's reputation is reconfirmed a century later by the poet Anna Maria Lenngren (1754–1817). When paraphrasing Charles-François Panard's (1689–1765) Les merveilles de l'Opéra in her parody Operan ("The Opera"), she makes ironic use of Gaffelgränd:

Panard
J'ai vu l'aimable Cythérée; Aux doux regards, au teint fleuri Dans une machine entourée D'amours natifs de Chambéri.	I've seen the amiable from Kythera; Mild glances, colourful skin In a machine surrounded By lovers native from Chambéri.
Lenngren
Jag sett Cythérens drottning fara uti sin char med duvor spänd, och i sin gudom åtföljd vara av gracer ifrån Gaffelgränd.	I've seen the Queen of Kythera leave in her carriage pigeons lead, and in her divinity accompanied be by graces from Gaffelgränd.

== See also ==
- List of streets and squares in Gamla stan
