= Johannesgränd =

Alley in Gamla stan, Stockholm, Sweden

Coordinates: 59°19′25.3″N 18°04′27.8″E

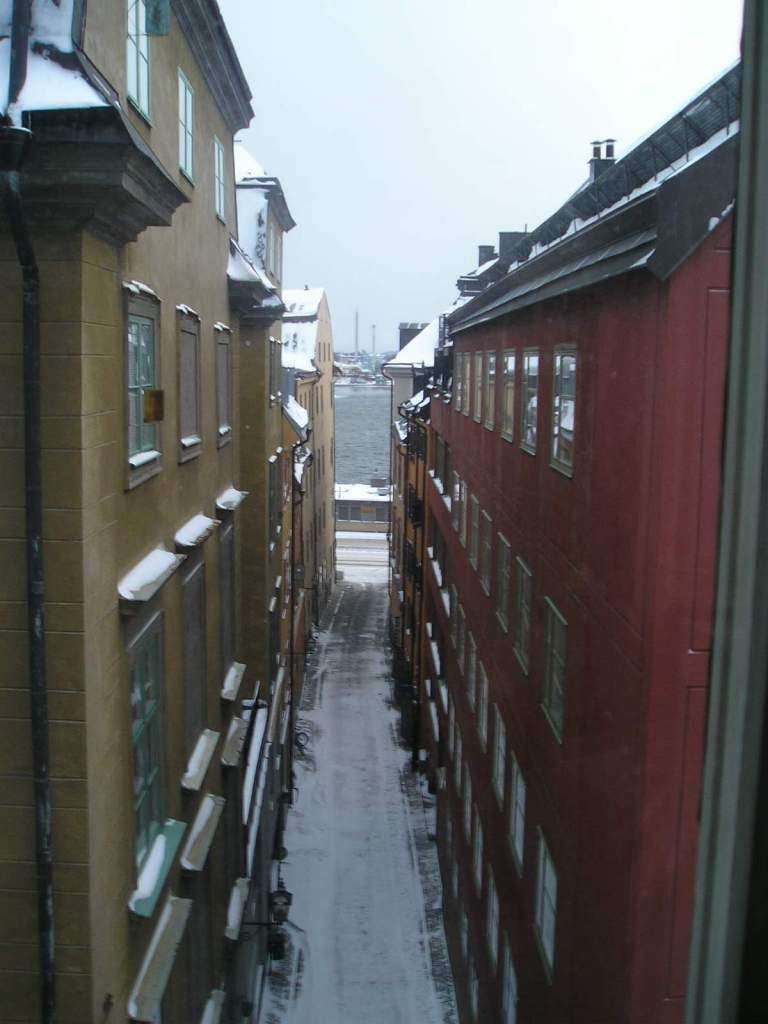
Johannesgränd viewed from Österlånggatan.

Johannesgränd (Swedish: "Alley of [Saint] John") is an alley in Gamla stan, the old town of Stockholm, Sweden, connecting Skeppsbron to Österlånggatan.

== History ==
First appearing in historical records as sancte johannis grendt in 1503, the alley forms a parallel street to Pelikansgränd, Lilla Hoparegränd, Gaffelgränd, and Packhusgränd. It derives its name from the church of the Order of Saint John, in the early 16th century found north of the eastern part of the alley. Records mentions the knightly order, with a presence in the city dating back to the 1330s, as owner of the site in 1499, and tells the church was inaugurated by a bishop from Strängnäs in 1514. Following the Reformation, the church was demolished a few years after 1530 and the site became royal property.

Excavations in the 1960s exposed parts of the church, including traces of a portal, the south-eastern corner of the foundation, and a limestone column. A small graveyard east of the church, in which excavations have unveiled remains of coffins and bones, is said to have been ravaged by King Gustav Vasa who was looking for raw material for his saltpetre production, a deed commented in the chronicles as Ej är kristeligt i väder så skjuta sina förfäder ("Not Christian is [in public] thus shoot/push one's ancestors").

== See also ==
- List of streets and squares in Gamla stan
- Fru Gunillas Gränd
