= Klarabergsleden =

Planned highway in Stockholm, Sweden

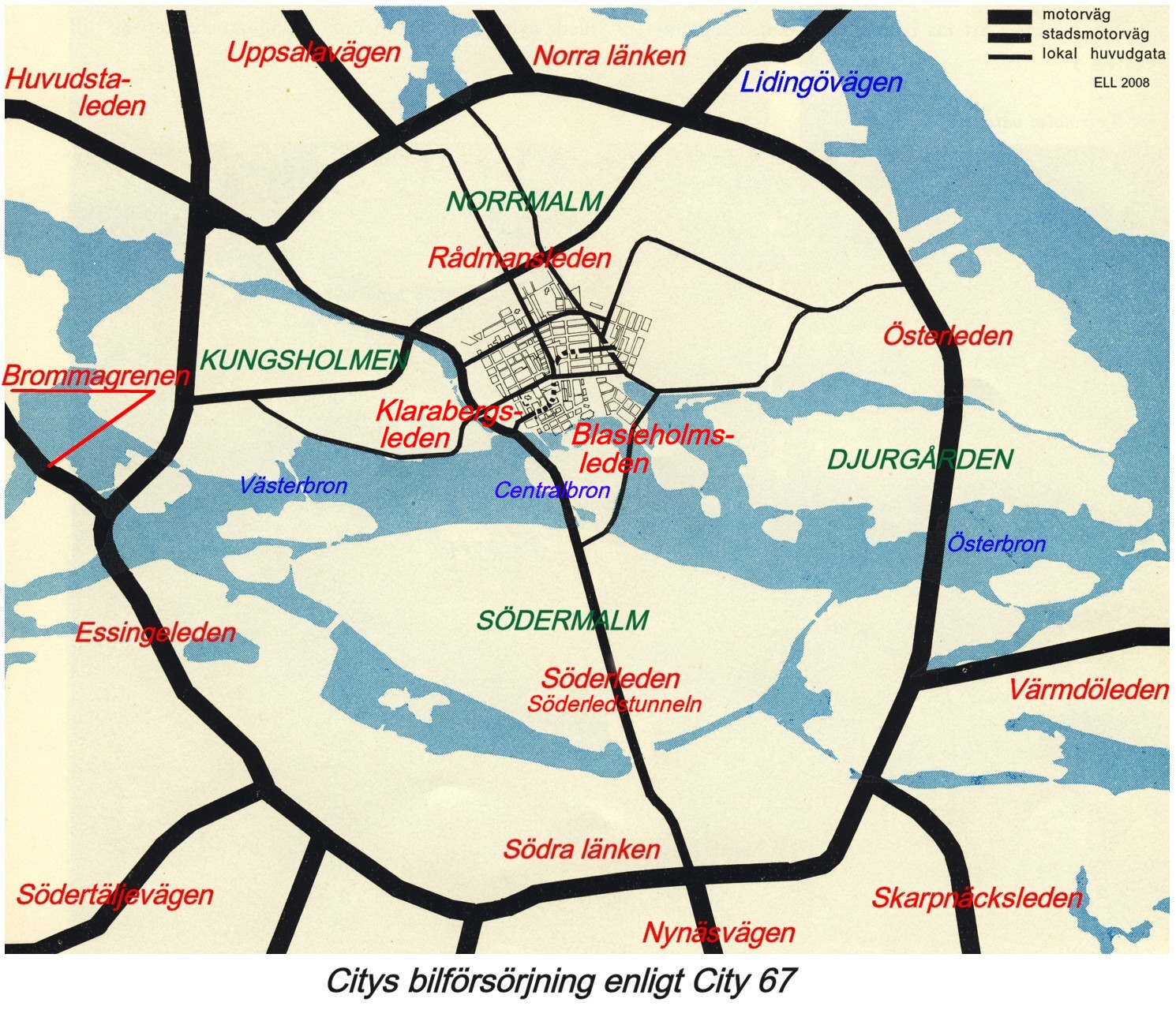
Klarabergsleden in the City 67 plan.

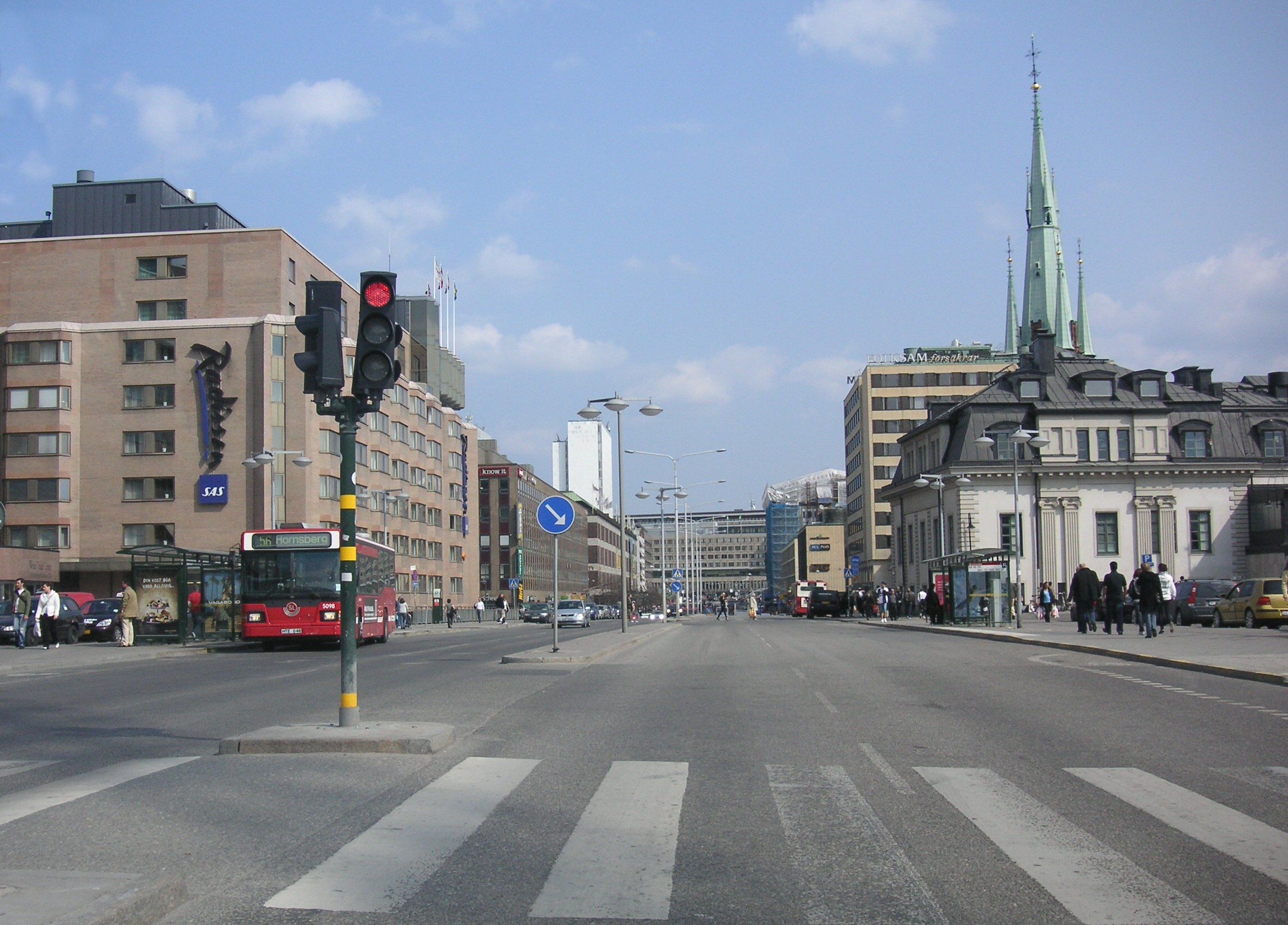
One of the few completed parts of Klarabergsleden: Klarabergsviadukten, view to the east and Klarabergsgatan, 2008.

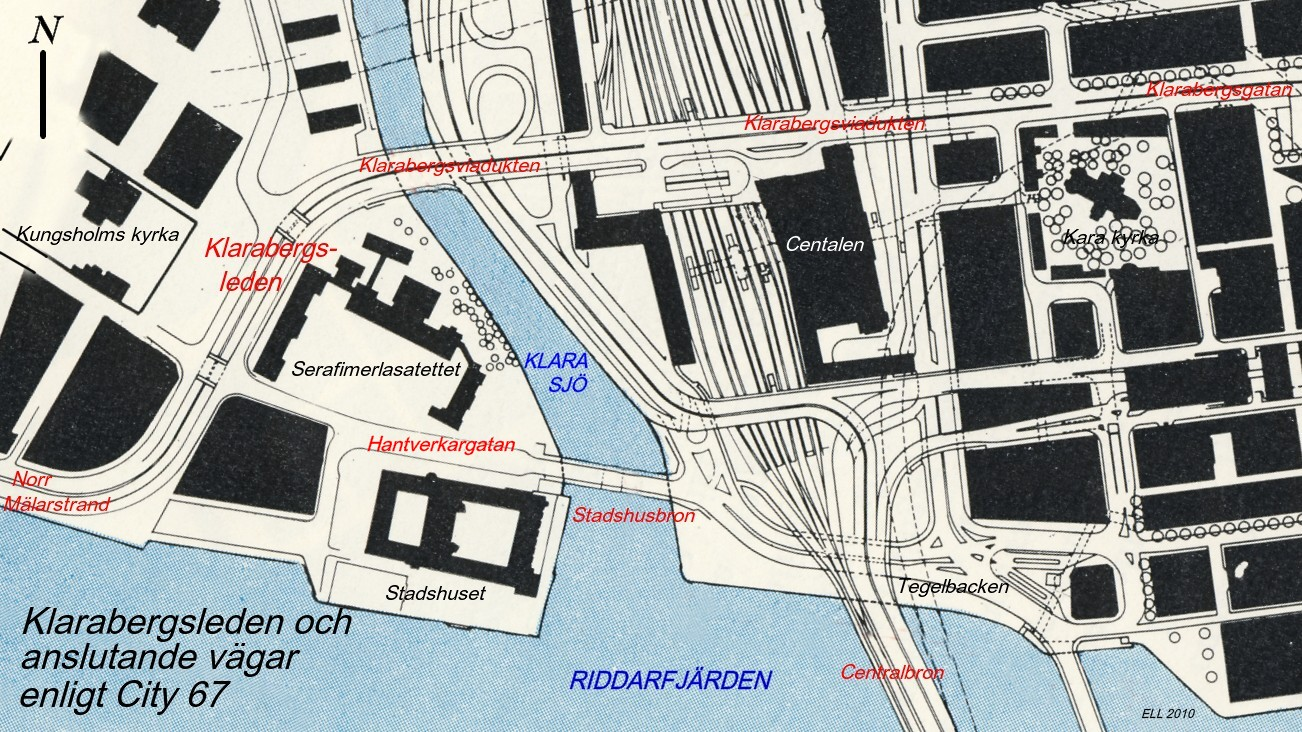
Klarabergsleden in the City 67 plan.

Klarabergsleden was a planned east–west main traffic route through southwestern Norrmalm and eastern Kungsholmen in Stockholm, Sweden. The plans to build this route were put on hold in 1974.

There was discussion about Klarabergsleden, an east–west traffic connection between the central parts of Stockholm, already in 1928. The route was first designed in a zoning plan in 1932. The width of the route was planned as 18 metres (59 ft).

To accommodate the increased car traffic after World War II the traffic planning department of the city of Stockholm designed a 31-metre-wide Klarabergsleden as an east–west main traffic route that would consist of a widened Norr Mälarstrand, Klarabergsviadukten, Klarabergsgatan and a widened Hamngatan. In the western part of Norr Mälarstrand the route would continue to Rålambshovsleden and in the eastern part of Hamngatan it would end at Strandvägen and Blasieholmsleden. Rålambshovsleden was completed in the 1930s and Hamngatan was widened in the 1960s. However, Blasieholmsleden was not built and Norr Mälarstrand was not widened.

During the redevelopment of Norrmalm and the "Stockholm City car traffic maintenance plan" according to the City 67 city plan the traffic route was described in detail. The plan was that Klarabergsleden would go from Klarabergsgatan via Klarabergsviadukten over the train tracks and the Klara Sjö canal, through the Serafimerlasarettet area and under Hantverkargatan onward through the Kungliga Myntet area and end at Norr Mälarstrand. The western parts of Serafirmerlasarettet would be torn down and Samuel Owens gata would be widened to 31 metres (102 ft).

Klarabergsviadukten was dimensioned for the upcoming Klarabergsleden, which was however never constructed. This led to the bridge being overdimensioned in relation to the traffic. According to representatives of the road building department, a significant part of the state grant given to the construction of the bridge could have been spent in a better way.
