= Clas Ohlson =

Swedish home improvement retail chain

Clas Ohlson AB

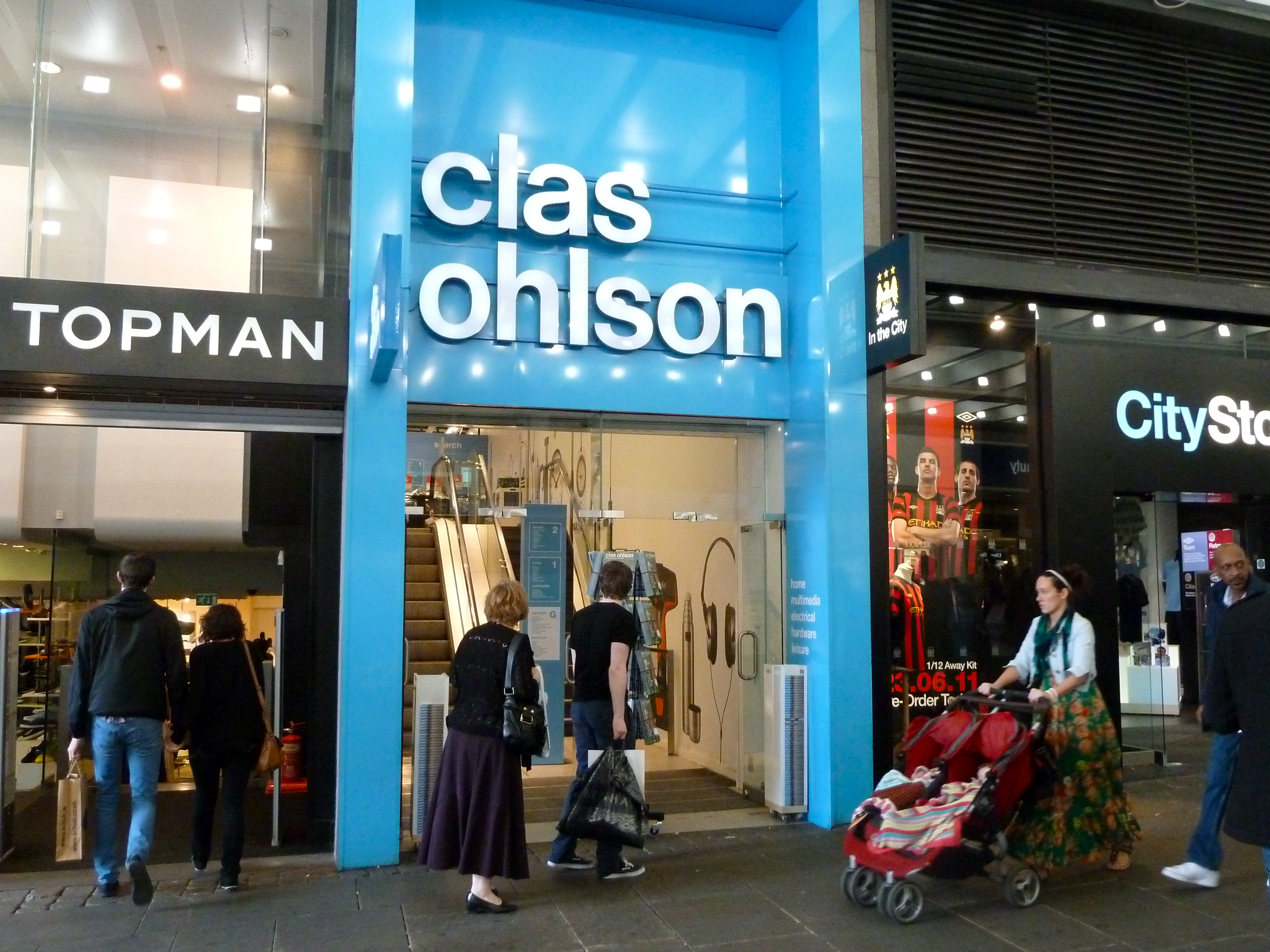
- Clas Ohlson store in Manchester (closed 2018 or 2019)
- Company type: Publicly traded Aktiebolag
- Traded as: Nasdaq Stockholm: CLAS B
- ISIN: SE0000584948
- Industry: Retail
- Founded: 27 July 1918; 107 years ago in Sweden
- Founder: Clas Ohlson
- Headquarters: Insjön, Dalarna, Sweden
- Revenue: ▲SEK 8,211 million (2017/2018)
- Number of employees: 5,000 (2017/2018)
- Website: clasohlson.se

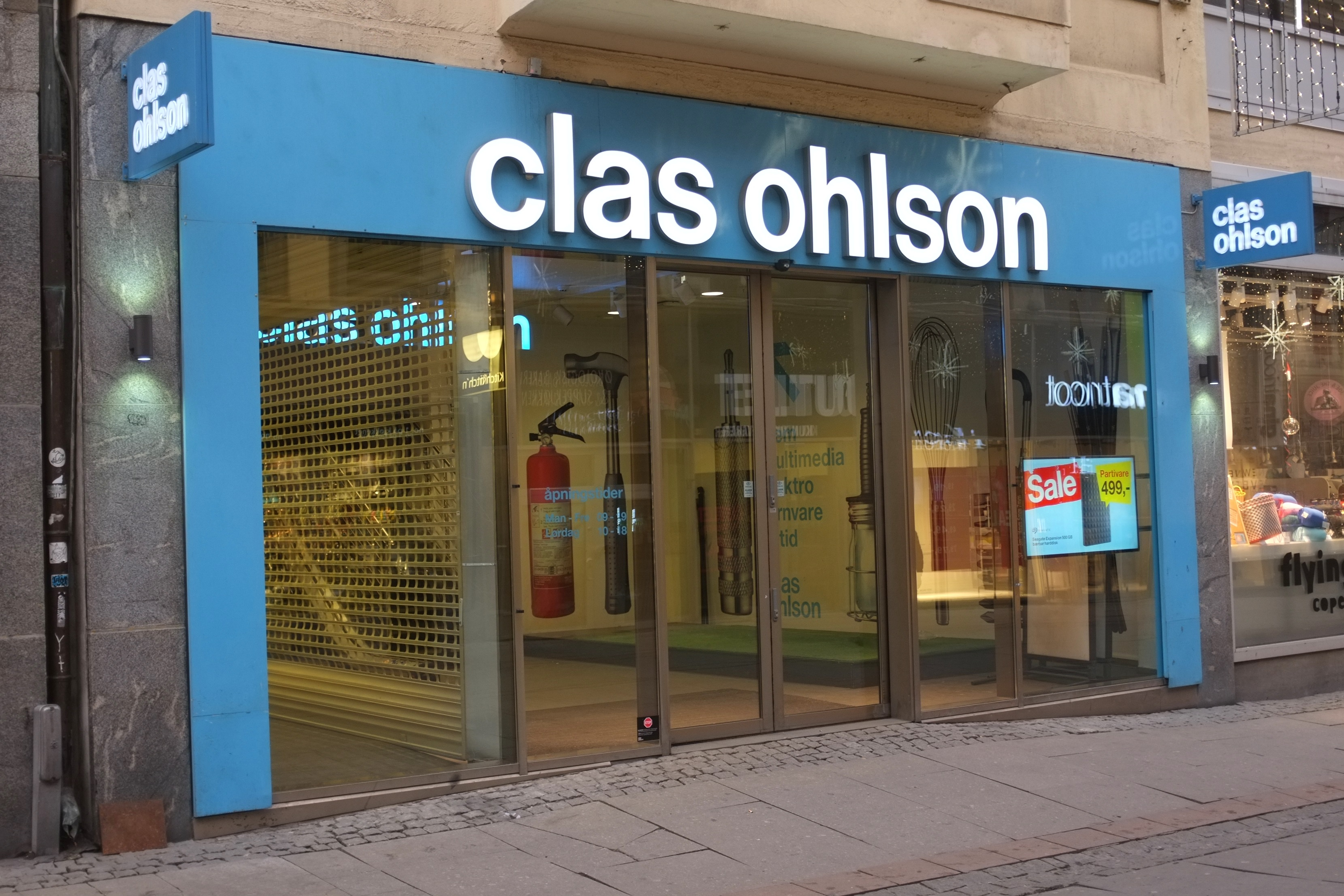
A typical Clas Ohlson branch in Oslo, Norway.

Clas Ohlson is a Swedish home improvement chain and mail-order firm that specialises in hardware, home, leisure, electrical and multimedia products. It is one of the biggest of its type in Scandinavia, with more than 230 Clas Ohlson stores as of May 2020. Stores also exist in Norway and Finland. Many of the products sold in the stores are own-label items. The company uses the house brands of Asaklitt (luggage and travel ware), Capere (bathroom supplies), Cocraft (DIY tools), Cotech (electrical tools), Coline (household electrical items), Exibel (household electrical items) and Clas Ohlson (all departments).

== History ==
The company was founded in 1918 by the technically minded Clas Ohlson (1895–1979), as a mail order business based in the Swedish village of Insjön, Dalarna. Initially, only manuals and technical literature were sold, thus allowing people who lived in rural communities to obtain literature that would otherwise be unavailable. He opened his first shop in Insjön in 1926, but it was not until 1989, when the company opened a store in a shopping centre in central Stockholm, that it expanded into the retail business.

The first store outside Sweden was opened in 1991 in Oslo, Norway and in 1999, the company was listed on the Stockholm Stock Exchange.

The first store in Finland was opened in 2002 in Helsinki and in 2008, the company opened its first UK retail store in Croydon, England.

In 2014 the company entered a joint venture with Kuwait's Al Homaizi group. In May that year, the company opened the first Clas Ohlson branch outside Europe, a store in Dubai's Mirdif City Centre. It was, the Swedish company said, "a first step into the fast-growing Gulf Co-operation Council region". The livestock-to-sportswear Al Homaizi group had in 1987 opened a flat-pack furniture store in Kuwait with Swedish retailer IKEA, under whose name the store traded. The Dubai branch later closed, with Clas Ohlson focusing on European expansion.

In 2016, Clas Ohlson continued its expansion by opening stores in Hamburg, Germany; these stores closed following an announcement in 2018 from the company that its German stores, plus its remaining UK store - located in Reading - would cease trading.
