= Åhléns =

Chain of Swedish department stores

- Genre: Department store
- Founded: 1899; 127 years ago in Insjön, Leksand, Sweden
- Founder: Johan Petter Åhlén; Erik Holm
- Headquarters: Stockholm, Sweden
- Website: Åhléns.se

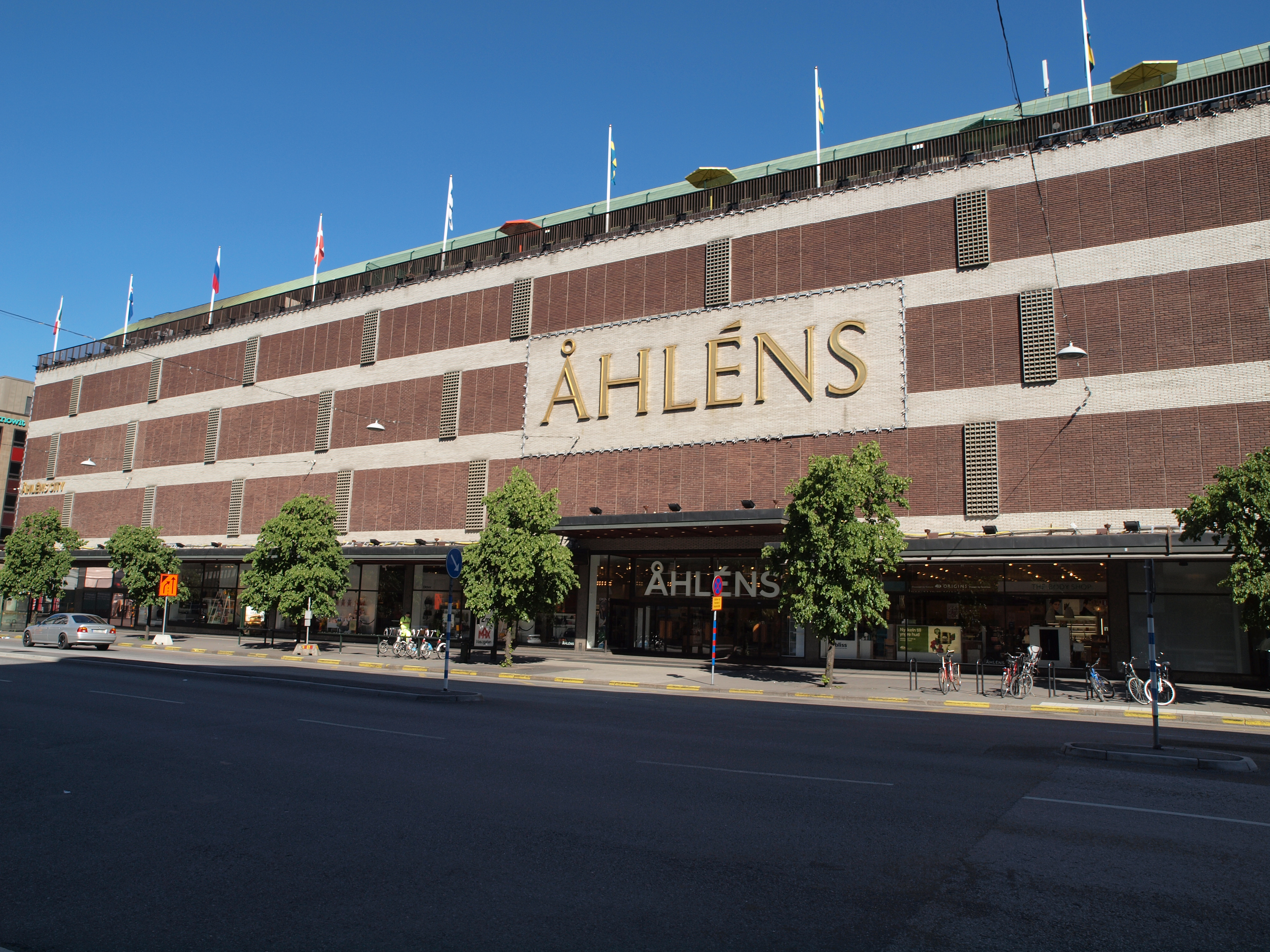
Åhléns City in Stockholm are one of the biggest department stores in Sweden.

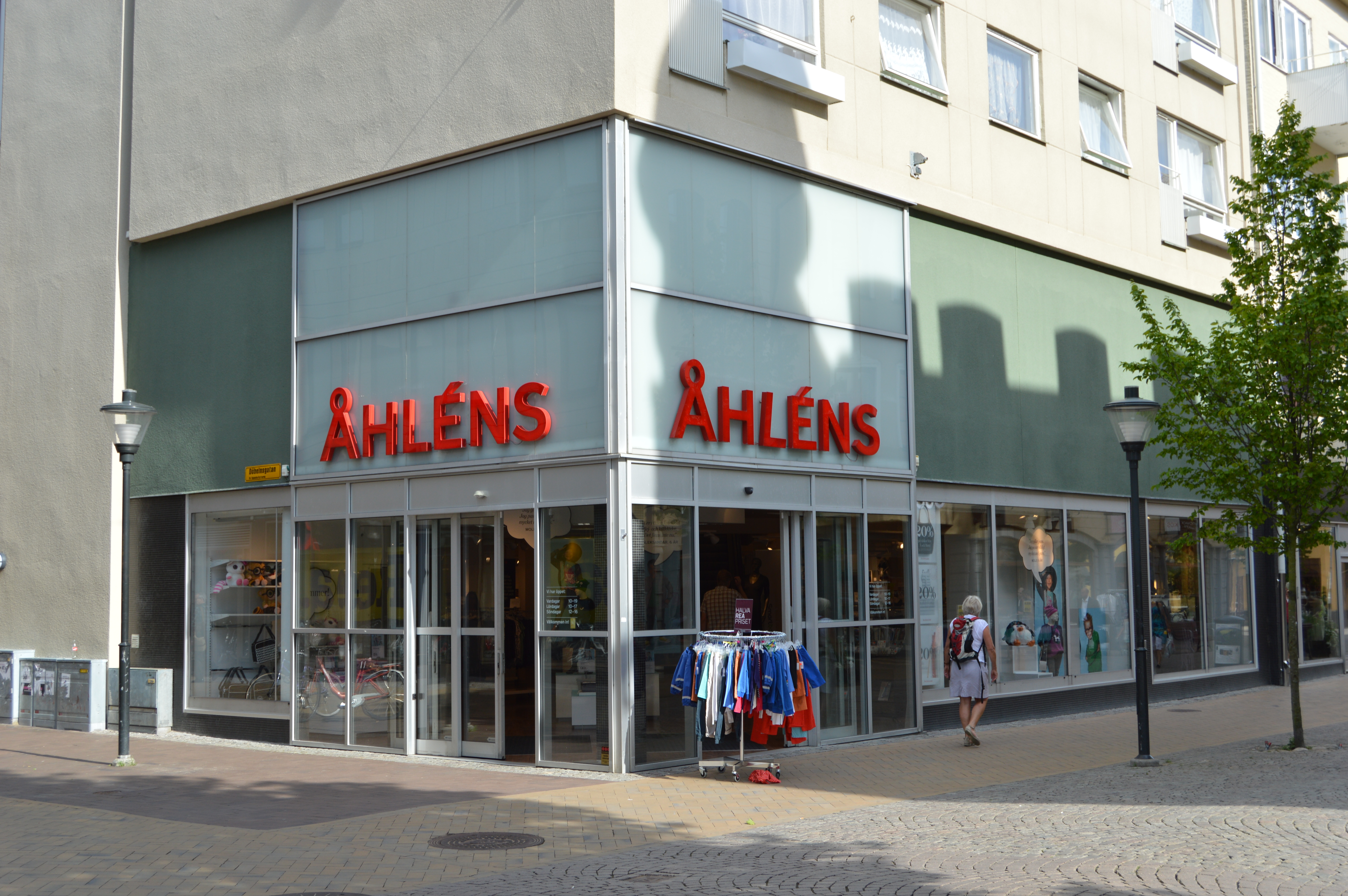
Åhléns in Kristianstad.

Åhléns (Swedish pronunciation: [oːˈleːns]) is a chain of Swedish department stores. With locations in almost every city in the country, including 18 in Stockholm alone as of March 2007, it is the fourth largest group of fashion stores in Sweden.

== History ==
Åhléns began as a mail order business. It was created in 1899 by Johan Petter Åhlén and Erik Holm, in the little town of Insjön in the province of Dalarna. The name of the company was first "Åhlén och Holm" (Åhlén and Holm).

The first item sold by the company was a print of the royal family. Over 100,000 copies were sold, and it was very successful. Åhlén and Holm continued to grow over the years. After only 10 years, JP Åhlén had a company with a worth of 1.5 million SEK and 255 employees. In 1915, the company moved to Stockholm with half its employees. Before he moved the company, JP Åhlén secured a seven-floor storage building.

In 1932, Åhlén decided that he wanted to expand the business and create a retail trade store with low prices. He established the Tempo department store and opened it on Östermalmstorg in Stockholm. Åhlén died in 1939, leaving control of the companies to his oldest son. On the 50th anniversary (1945) of the establishment of Åhléns and Holm, the company boasted a worth of 87 million SEK, and with a force of more than 2700 workers.

The mail order business was shut down in the 1960s, and a store called Åhléns City was opened in 1964 in City, in the heart of Stockholm. In 1985, all the Tempo department stores re-branded as Åhléns. In 1988, Åhléns City was sold to Axel Johnson AB, which is owned by Antonia Ax:son Johnson. In 2022, Axel Johnson AB sold Åhléns to Axcent of Scandinavia AB, which is owned by Ayad Al-Saffar. Härstedt & Jansson Invest AB also became passive minority investors in this deal.

Åhléns stores have now been converted into department stores and moved upmarket, and now concentrate on four business areas: Fashion (Mode), Beauty (Skönhet), Homeware (Hem), and Media. Åhléns' loyalty card is called the Åhléns Club.

In 2009, Åhléns City's sales totalled 6202 million SEK in stores, and the profit was 216 million SEK.

In 2017, a stolen vehicle driven by a man made his way in central Stockholm, ended up in front of the Åhléns department store in a terrorist attack. Five died and fourteen others were seriously injured.
