= Insjön =

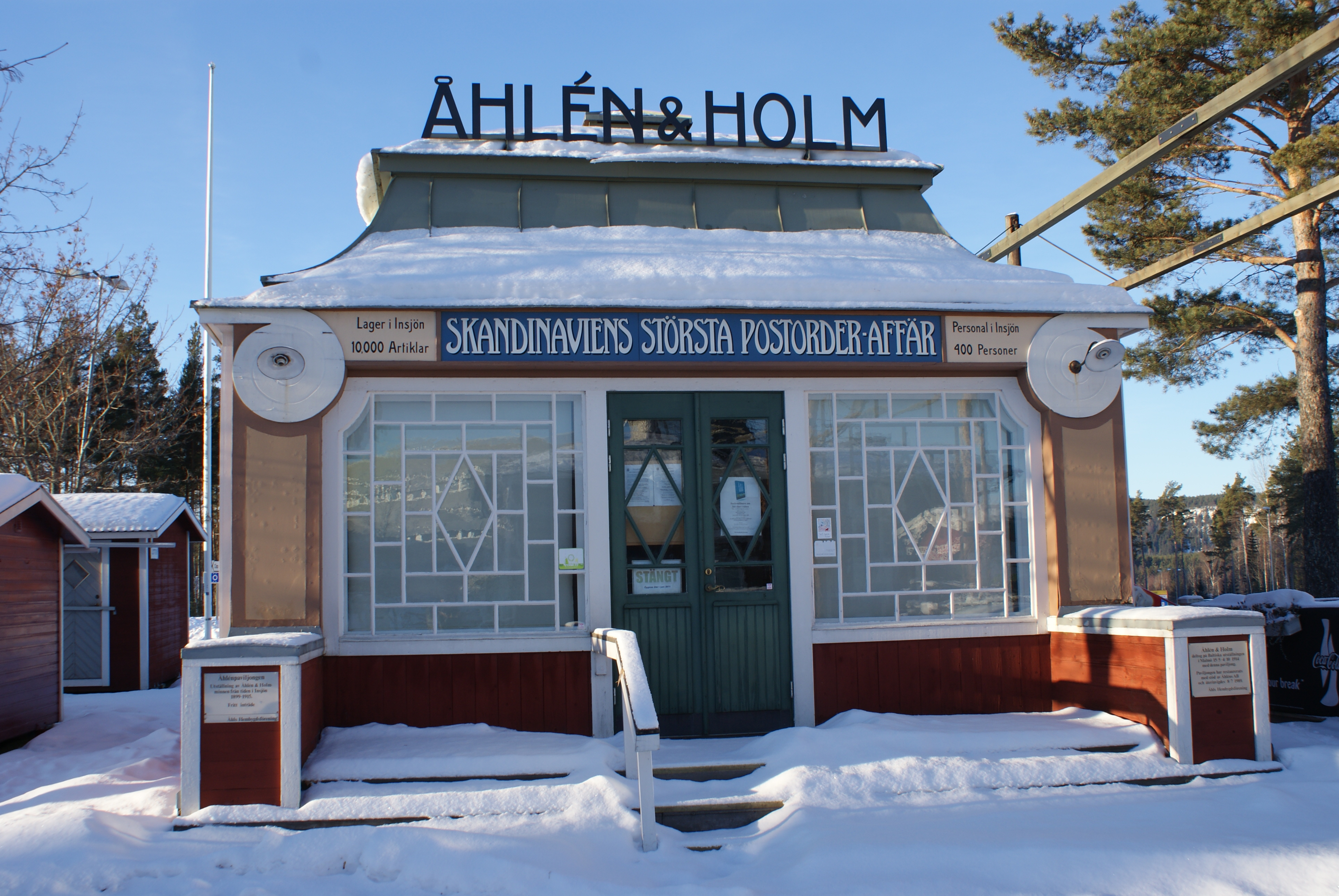
- The Åhlens Pavilion which relocated to Insjön after the Baltic Exhibition

- Location within Dalarna Location within Sweden
- Coordinates: 60°41′N 15°06′E
- Country: Sweden
- Province: Dalarna
- County: Dalarna County
- Municipality: Leksand Municipality

Area
  - Total: 3.48 km^{2} (1.34 sq mi)

Population (31 December 2010)
  - Total: 2,149
  - Density: 618/km^{2} (1,600/sq mi)
- Time zone: UTC+1 (CET)
  - Summer (DST): UTC+2 (CEST)

Insjön is a locality situated in Leksand Municipality, Dalarna County, Sweden with 2,149 inhabitants in 2010. In 1899 Åhléns started out as the mail order business Åhlén & Holm. 19 years later, in 1918, the mail order firm Clas Ohlson was founded in Insjön. The sawmill Bergkvist sågen was also founded here.
