= Redevelopment of Norrmalm =

20th century urban development project in Sweden

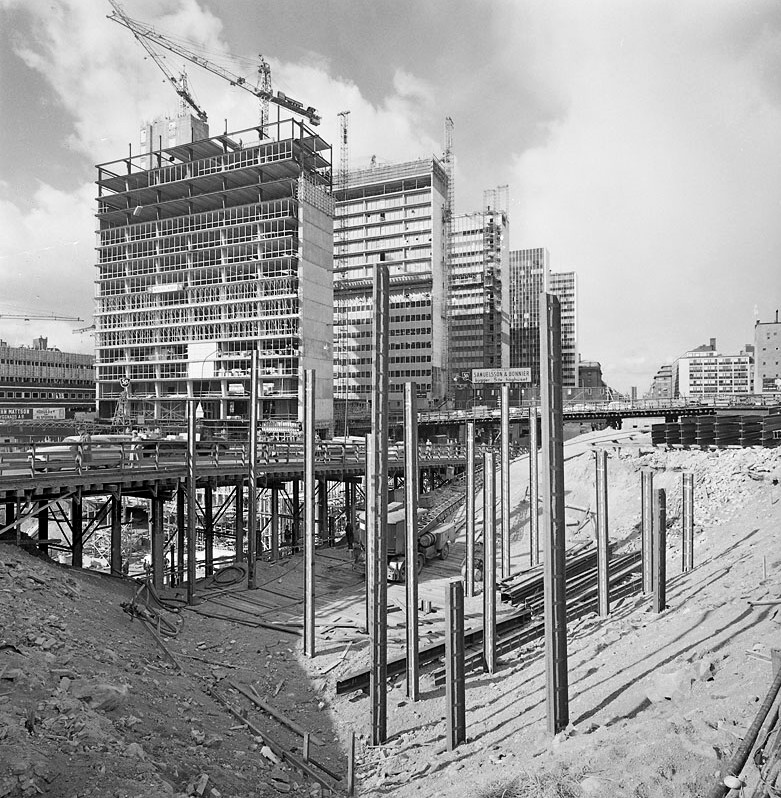
"The five trumpet-blasts" under construction in 1964.

The redevelopment of Norrmalm (Swedish: Norrmalmsregleringen; lit. 'the Norrmalm regulation') was a major revision of the city plan for lower Norrmalm district in Stockholm, Sweden, which was principally decided by the Stockholm town council in 1945, and realised during the 1950s, 1960s, and 1970s. The renewal resulted in most of the old Klara area being replaced with the modern City of Stockholm, according to rigorist CBD ideas, while the Stockholm Metro was facilitated through the city. As a result of the project, over 750 buildings were demolished to make way for new infrastructure and redevelopment.

The renewal of Norrmalm was the largest Swedish urban development project to date and engaged a large part of Sweden's architectural elite. The Norrmalm renewal has been criticised and admired throughout Sweden and internationally, and is regarded as one of the larger and most full-of-character of all city renewals in Europe in the aftermath of World War II, even including cities that were bombed during the war. Key politicians behind the massive project included Yngve Larsson and Hjalmar Mehr.

== See also ==
- Californication
- Manhattanization
- Brusselization

== Literature ==
- Per Olgarsson (2009). Recording and Characterizing the Modern City Centre of Stockholm (PDF). Stockholm City Museum.
