= Sankt Eriksbron =

Bridge in central Stockholm, Sweden

Coordinates: 59°20′13.8″N 18°02′04.5″E

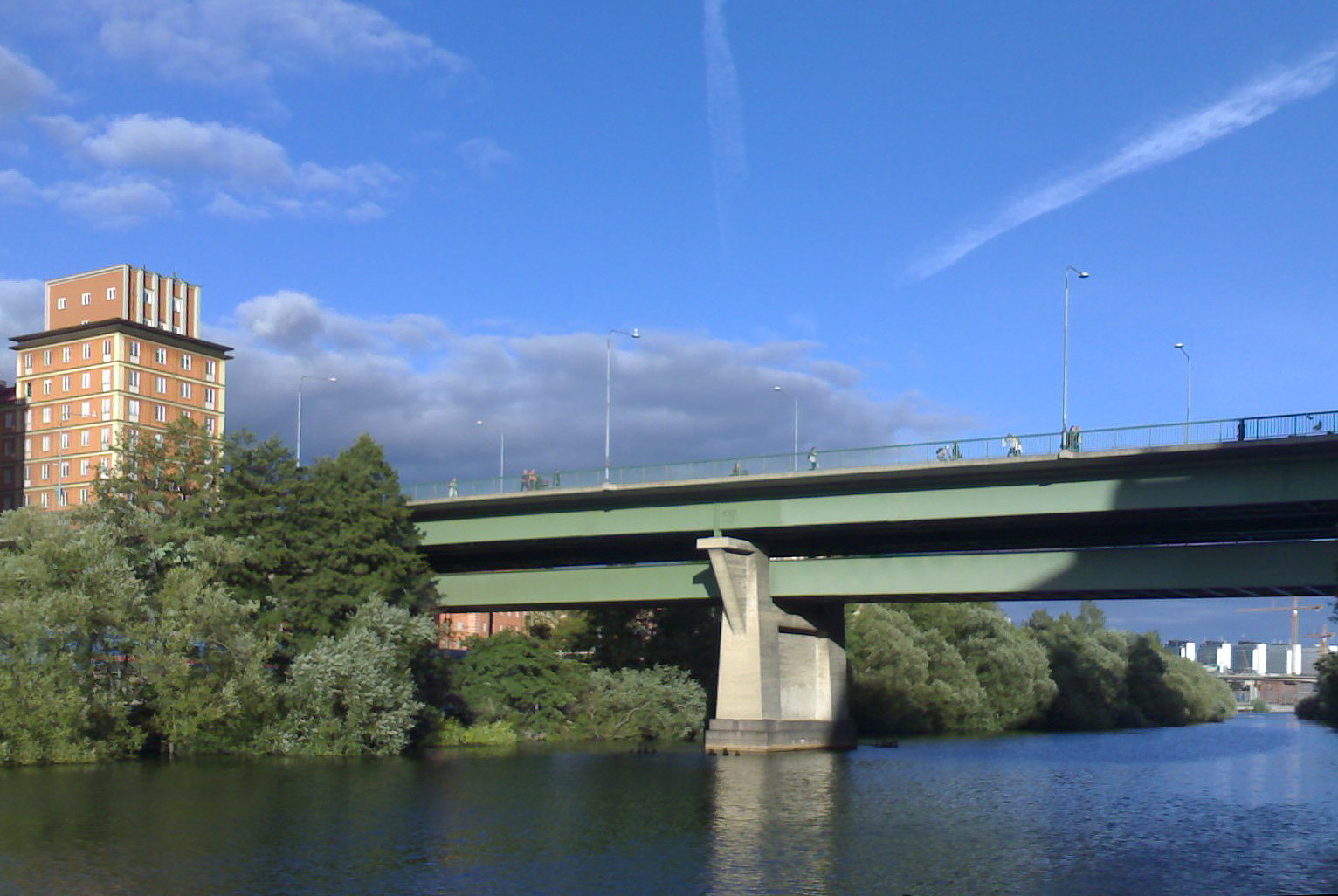
Sankt Eriksbron in September 2006.

Sankt Eriksbron (English: "The St Eric Bridge") is a bridge in central Stockholm, Sweden. Passing over Barnhusviken it connects Kungsholmen to Norrmalm. The present construction was inaugurated in 1937. Neighbouring bridges are: Kungsbron, Barnhusbron, Stadshusbron, Klarabergsviadukten, and Ekelundsbron.

== About the name ==
The name refers to the patron saint of Stockholm, Eric IX of Sweden (1120–1160), often called "St Eric". It was given to the street passing over the bridge, Sankt Eriksgatan, in 1885 when patriotic and historical names were regarded as appropriate for most structures.

== History ==
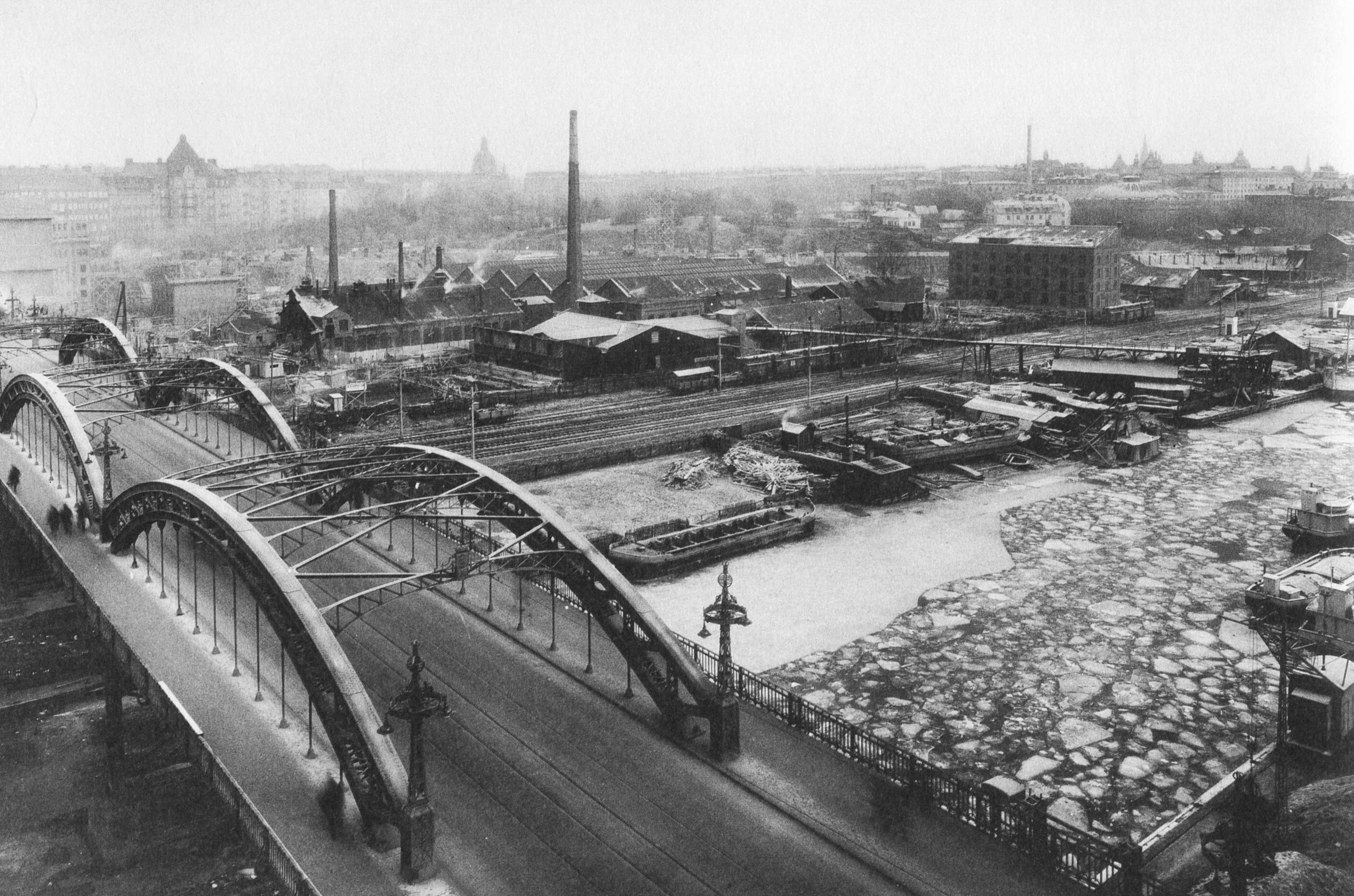
Sankt Eriksbron in 1927.

In the 1880s Stockholm was expanding rapidly and the two small bridges connecting Kungsholmen and Norrmalm, 2.5 km apart, were considered insufficient. The influential city planner Albert Lindhagen (1823–1887) did propose a bridge south of the present one in 1866, but its current location was established in a city plan approved in 1880. Different solutions were considered before 1900, including a 15-m wide steel bridge, considered too expensive; a 12-m wide wooden bridge; and a ferry combined with a pontoon bridge during winters. The capsizing of a rowing boat in the waters at the site of the present bridge in 1898, killing 5 of the 22 aboard, intensified efforts to have the bridge project completed.

In 1900, the city council decided upon an 18-m wide and 227-m long steel bridge with a navigable clearance of 15.2 m, and the foundation work was started in 1903. When finished in 1906, the bridge had three central spans with 40-m long arched main girders, a roadway made of blocks of wood paving, and two footways made of mastic asphalt.

As the area on both side of the bridge underwent a rapid development paired by the simultaneous exploitation of the western suburbs, the importance of the bridge grew, and by the mid-1930s the traffic load motivated a reconstruction and widening of the bridge. The old foundations were reinforced while the old steel construction was replaced by plate girders carrying a 24-m wide concrete floor. Under the roadway space was reserved for a future metro, later installed after World War II.

== See also ==
- List of bridges in Stockholm
