= Blekholmsbron =

Pedestrian bridge in central Stockholm, Sweden

Coordinates: 59°19′53.5″N 18°3′2.7″E

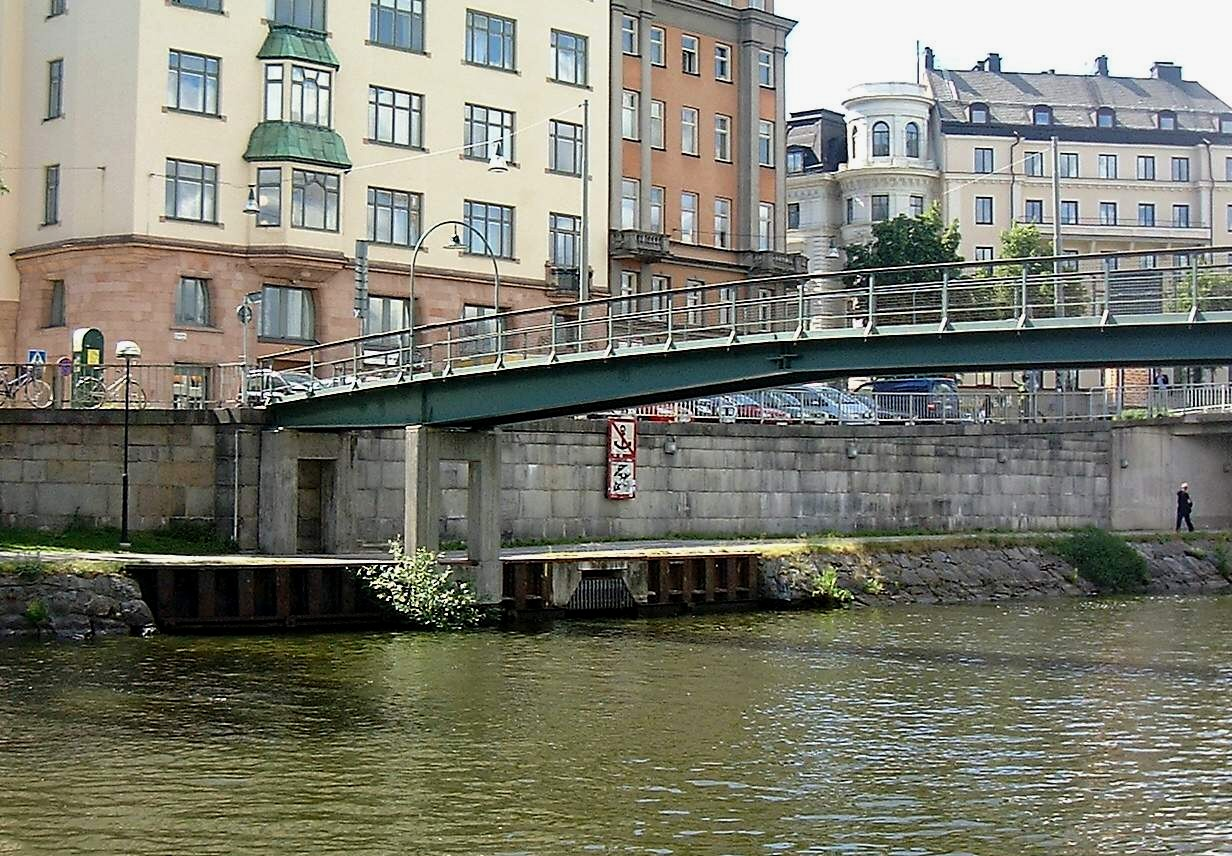
Western end of Blekholmsbron with Kungsholmen in the background.

Blekholmsbron (Swedish: "Bridge of Bleaching Islet") is a pedestrian bridge in central Stockholm, Sweden. Stretching over Klara Sjö, it connects Norrmalm to Kungsholmen.

The bridge is about 55 metres long between the abutments, of which some 32 metres passes over water with a horizontal clearance of 3,3 metres.

It is named after Blekholmen ("The Bleaching Islet"), a small islet once located in Klara Sjö until continuous landfilling made it part of Norrmalm during the 18th century. This name dates from at least the 17th century and is most likely referring to the fabrics laid out for bleaching on the islet.

Other nearby bridges include: Kungsbron, Sankt Eriksbron, Stadshusbron, and Klarabergsviadukten.

== See also ==
- List of bridges in Stockholm
