= Karlbergskanalen =

Canal in western central Stockholm, Sweden

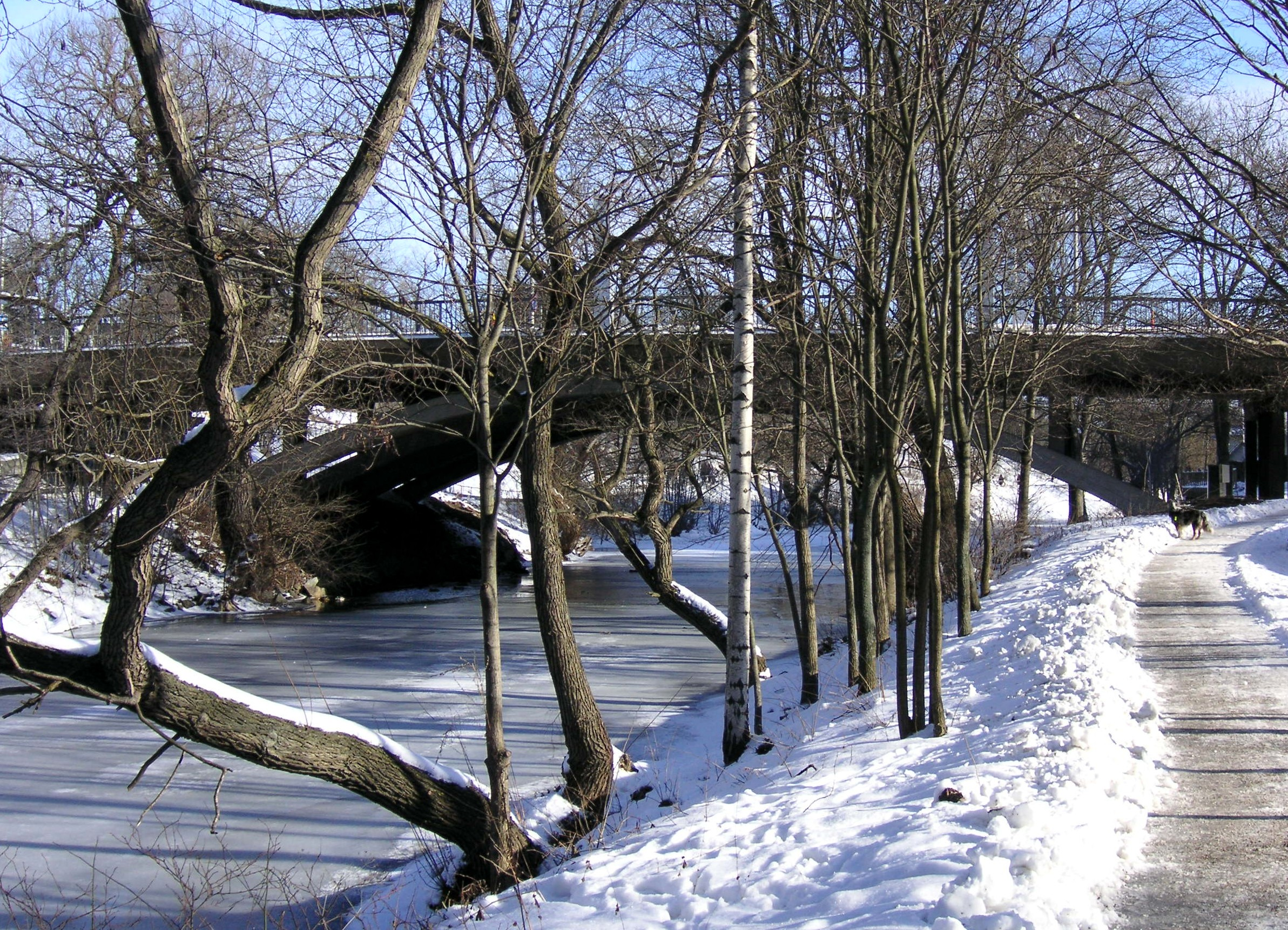
Karlbergskanalen in February 2006

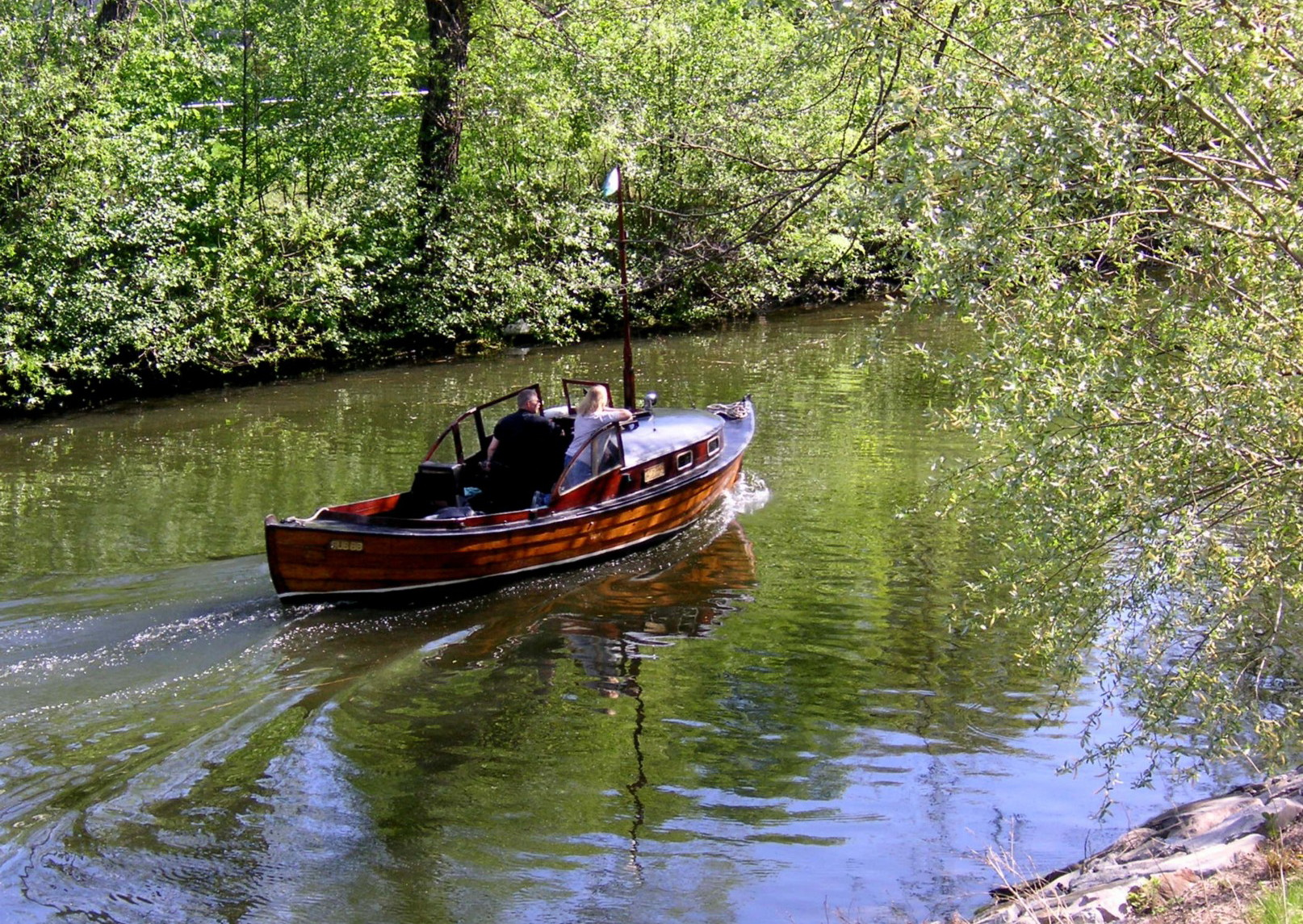
Karlbergskanalen in May 2006

Karlbergskanalen (Swedish for "Canal of Karlberg") is a canal in western central Stockholm, Sweden.

Separating the island of Kungsholmen from the northern municipality Solna, it connects Ulvsundasjön to Karlbergssjön and thus forms the westernmost part of the nameless body of water which separates Kungsholmen from the northern city districts Vasastaden and Norrmalm; the other sections being Karlbergssjön, Barnhusviken, and Klara Sjö.

Two bridges are stretching over the canal: Modest in size Ekelundsbron (formerly Karlbergsbron), offering a maximum vertical clearance of 5.1 m, is overshadowed by the forest of massive concrete pillars and wide roadways of the Essingeleden motorway passing high above the idyllic rural scenery below.

Karlbergskanalen is surrounded by trees and green spaces. Much of the character of the northern shore is dependent of the park of the nearby Karlberg Palace and the recreational space surrounding it. Along the southern shore is a walk continuing all the way to the Stockholm City Hall more than 2 km away. Parts of the residential buildings in the Stadshagen district is located next to the canal together with allotment gardens and a few older buildings, including the small but charming Mariedal palace originally built as a private residence in 1849.

Coordinates are: 59°20′24″N 18°08′52″E.

== History ==
Originally dug in 1832–1833, the canal was made 600 ell in length and 6 feet in depth. During the first decade, less than 400 ships and barges, and some 4,000 rowing boats annually found use for it. The remain of the watercourse was dredged during the 1840s and the entire canal subsequently deepened during the 1860s to between 2.97–5.94 metres. The first primitive swing bridge was replaced until 1909 by a new steel swing bridge, still operated manually until finally replaced by a static concrete bridge in the 1950s.

== See also ==
- Geography of Stockholm
