= Barnhusbron =

Bridge in central Stockholm, Sweden

Coordinates: 59°20′6.5″N 18°2′48.0″E

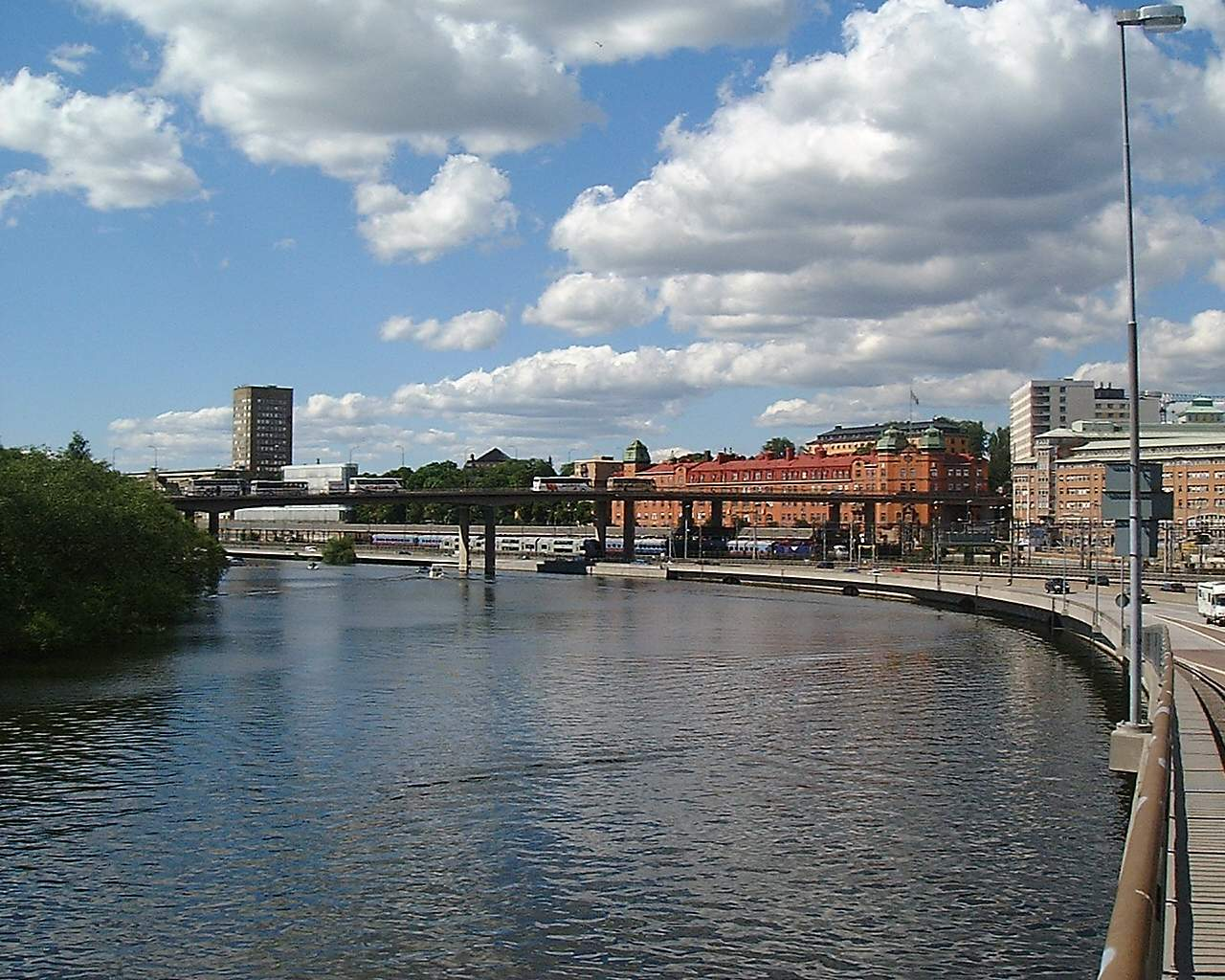
Barnhusbron 2007.

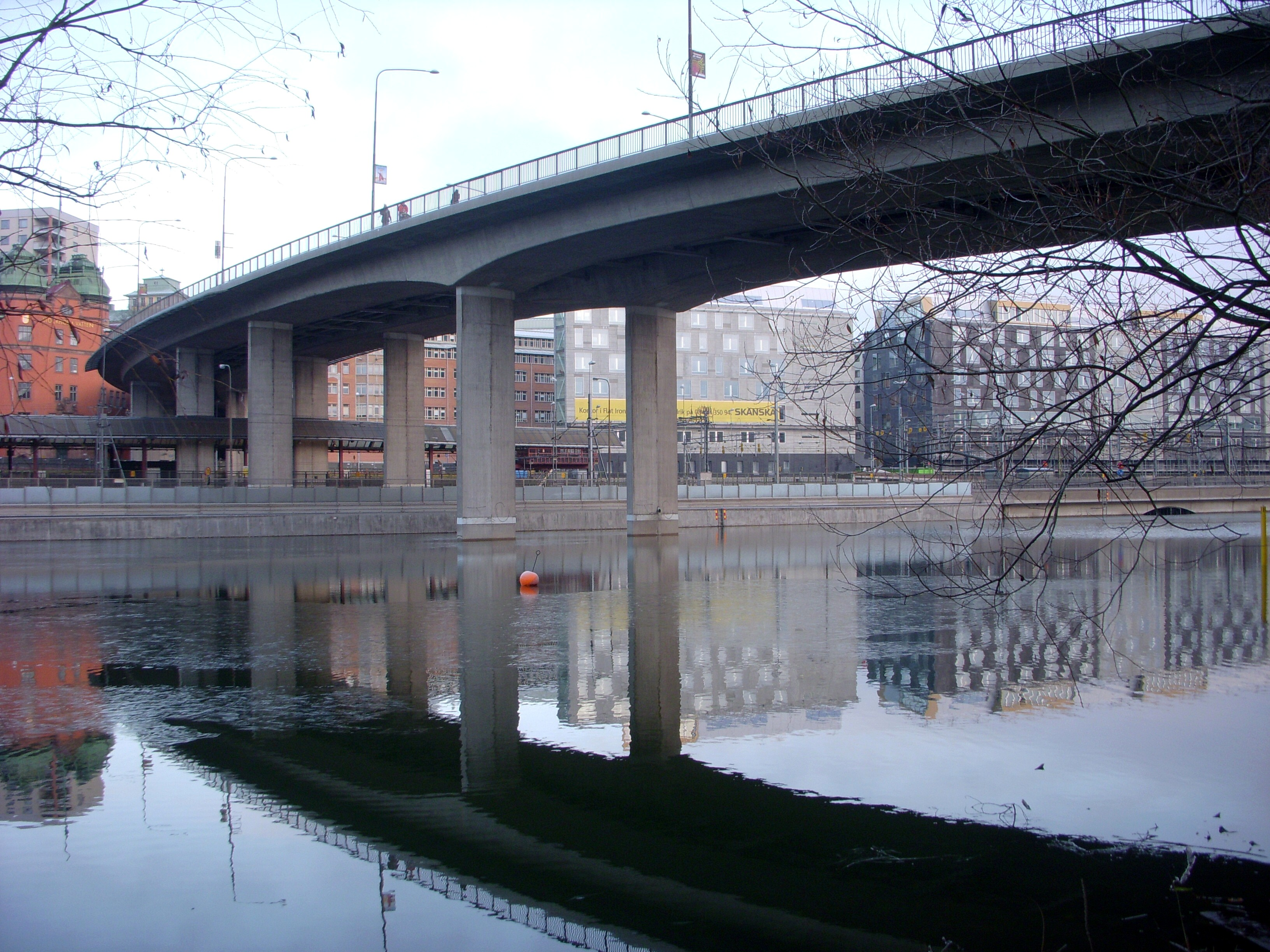
Barnhusbron 2008.

Barnhusbron (Swedish: "The Orphanage Bridge") is a bridge in central Stockholm, Sweden. Passing over Barnhusviken, it connects Kungsholmen to Norrmalm. It is 23 metres wide and 290 metres long with a maximum span of 64.5 metres. The roadway is made of prestressed concrete except for two non-tensioned concrete section in its eastern end.

Built in 1969 and of mostly local importance, Barnhusbron connects Scheelegatan on Kungsholmen to Tegnérgatan on Norrmalm, failing to fulfill its original purpose, to relieve the traffic load of its two older neighbouring bridges. Another misjudgment, now scrapped plans to relocate the Klarastrandsleden motorway to a viaduct above the railway, both still passing under the bridge on the ground, caused to bridge to be made exceptionally tall to be a bridge in central Stockholm.

Nearby bridges include Kungsbron, Sankt Eriksbron, Stadshusbron, Klarabergsviadukten, and Ekelundsbron.

== About the name ==
In the 1630s, an orphanage (barnhus) and penitentiary (tukthus) on Riddarholmen were moved to two buildings on a street north of Norra Latin today called Barnhusgatan. The bridge, together with several other structures and areas, were named after the orphanage around 1860 when the area underwent an urbanization process.

== See also ==
- List of bridges in Stockholm
- Allmänna BB
