= Ekelundsbron =

Bridge in Stockholm, Sweden

Coordinates: 59°20′26.60″N 18°00′46.75″E

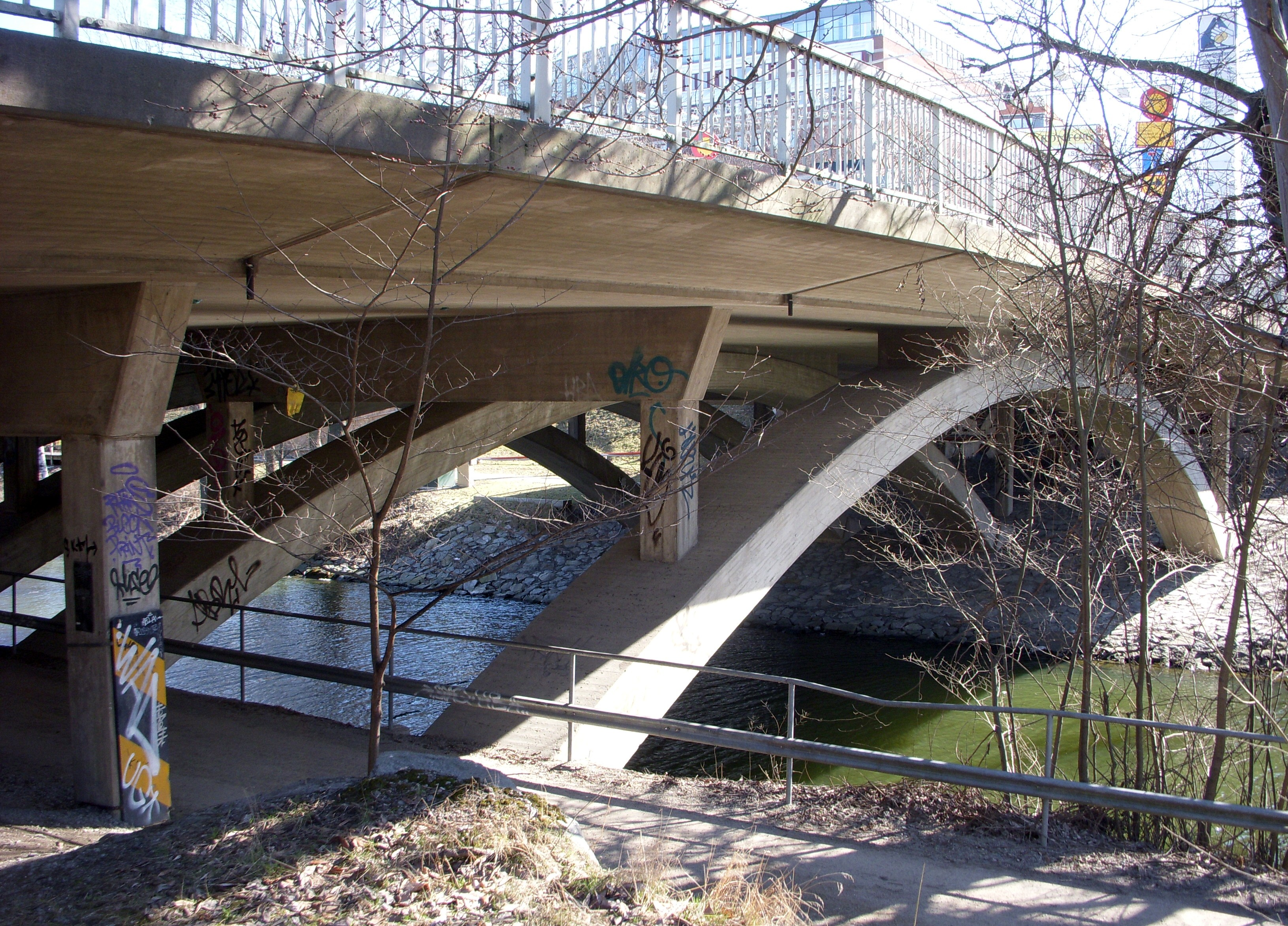
Ekelundsbron seen from Solna

Ekelundsbron (Swedish: "The Ekelund Bridge") is a bridge in Stockholm, Sweden. Passing over the canal Karlbergskanalen, it connects the city district Stadshagen on Kungsholmen to the northern suburb Solna.

The bridge is named after the crofter's holding once found nearby called Ekelund or Eklundstorpet (ek = "oak", lund = "grove", torp = "cottage"), which also gave its name to the shanty town found here around 1880. The bridge was earlier called Karlbergsbron.

Historically, the bridge was a simple wooden bridge crossing a clogged canal. When the canal was rebuilt in 1864, a 34.5-metre-long (113 ft) and 5.5-metre-wide (18 ft) steel swing bridge replaced the old bridge. A 12-metre-wide (39 ft) concrete bridge resting on concrete arches built in 1956 proved insufficient by 1969 and was thus replaced by a 24-metre-wide (79 ft) bridge.

== See also ==
- List of bridges in Stockholm
- Sankt Eriksbron
- Barnhusbron
- Essingeleden
