= Allmänna BB =

Maternity hospital in Stockholm, Sweden

Coordinates: 59°20′53″N 18°4′47″E

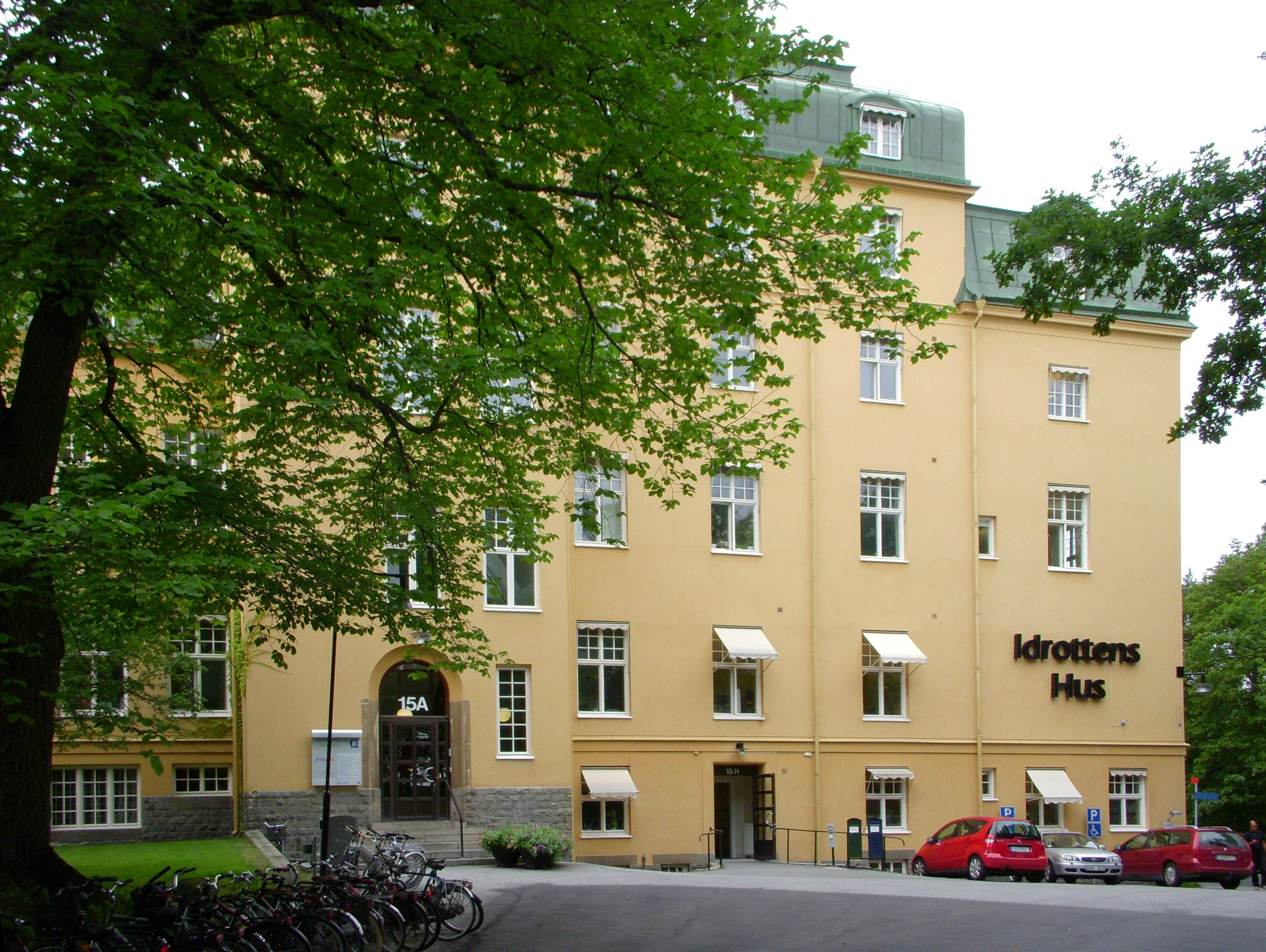
The building of Allmänna BB in 2010.

Allmänna BB (Allmänna barnbördshuset, "General maternity hospital", literally The general childbirth house) was a maternity hospital in Stockholm, Sweden. The hospital was inaugurated on February 20, 1775, on Riddarholmen. In 1785 the hospital moved to Östermalm and in 1795 changed its name to Allmänna barnbördshuset. In 1885 the hospital moved to Kungsholmen, but as the facilities became inadequate the hospital moved once again to use the former barracks used to house the athletes during the 1912 Summer Olympic Games. The new facilities were first used on January 5, 1913. Due to a decline in childbirths Allmänna BB was closed shortly after celebrating its 200th anniversary. The former facilities are presently used by the Royal Institute of Technology.

== See also ==
- Barnhusbron
