= Klara sjö =

Canal in central Stockholm, Sweden

Coordinates: 59°19′42″N 18°03′20″E

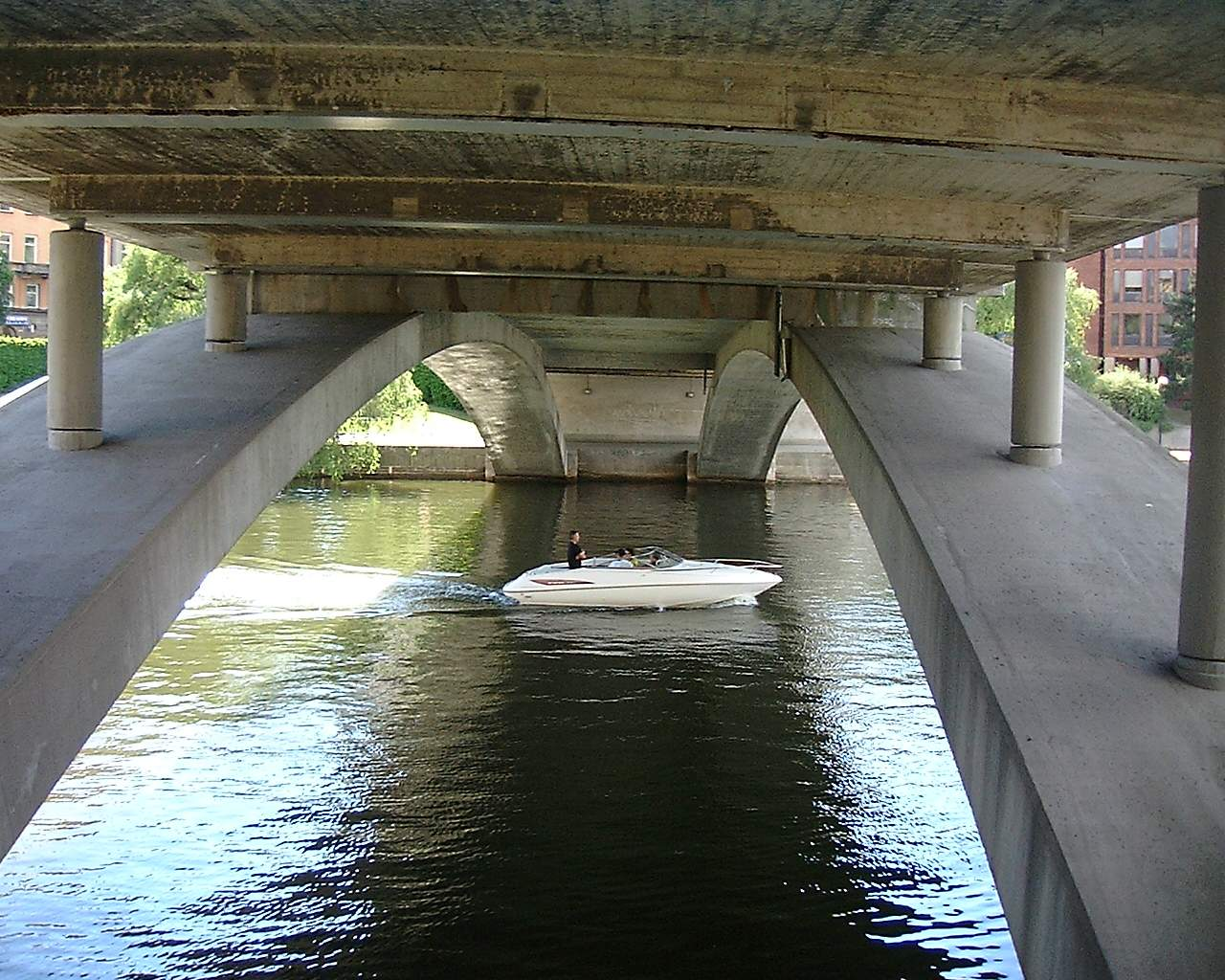
A pleasure boat passing through under a bridge at Klara sjö.

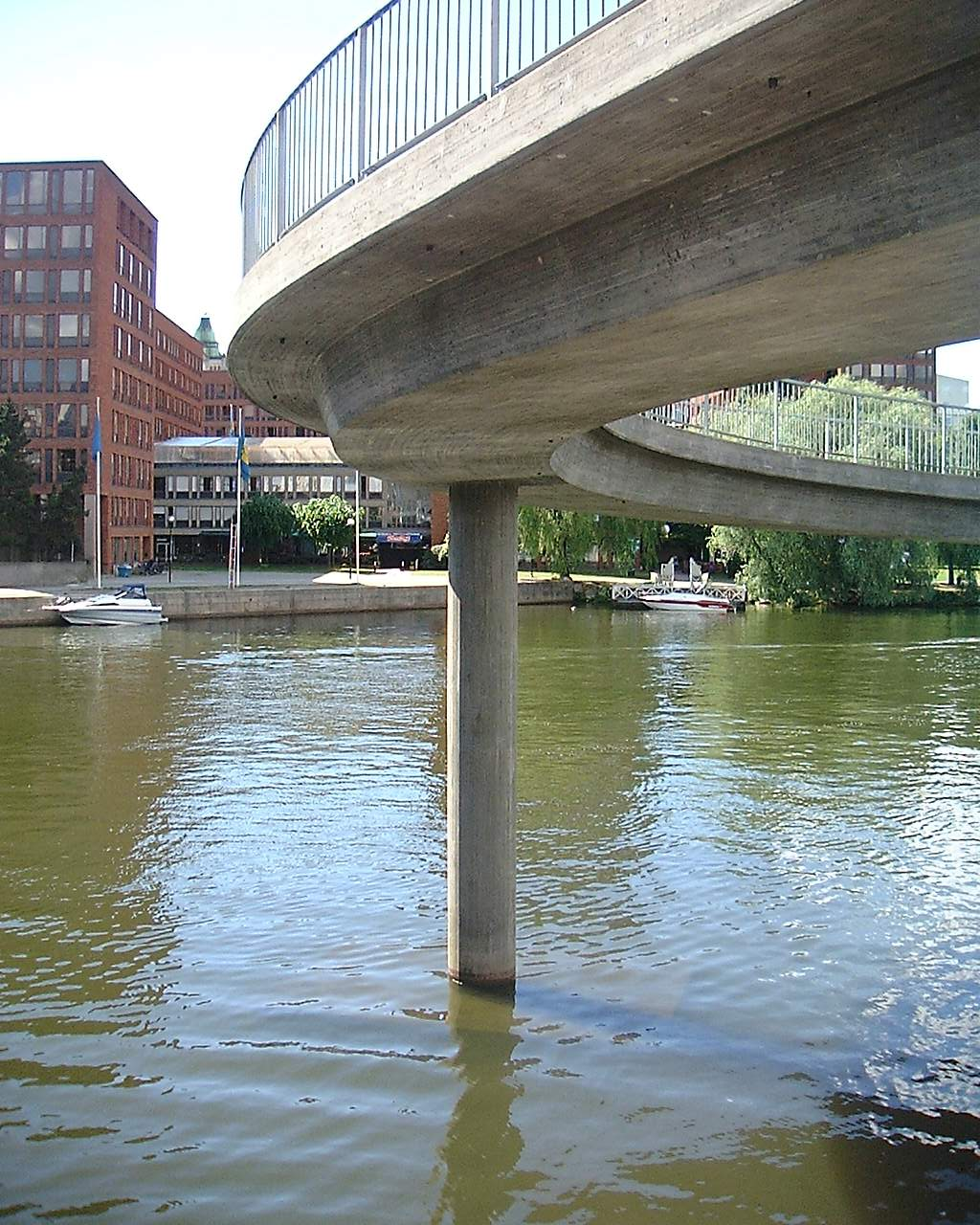
A concrete pillar supporting the circular pedestrian bridge Blekholmsslingan.

Klara sjö (Swedish for "Lake Klara") is a canal in central Stockholm, Sweden.

Separating the island Kungsholmen from the northern city district Norrmalm, the canal connects Barnhusviken to Riddarfjärden. Together with Barnhusviken, Karlbergssjön, and Karlbergskanalen, it thus forms part of the nameless body of water which separates Kungsholmen from the mainland districts north and east of it, Norrmalm and Vasastaden.

Four bridges stretches over the canal: Stadshusbron, Klarabergsviadukten, Kungsbron, and Blekholmsbron; the first of which limit the maximum height in the canal to 3.3 m.

Several prominent buildings are located near the canal: Most notably the Stockholm City Hall south of it, but also the Seraphim Hospital (Serafimerlasarettet) on the western shore, in operation 1752-1990.

The name of the canal is derived from the vicinity to the Klara district, in its turn named after a former monastery dedicated to Saint Clare. The canal is called a lake simply because it used to be a lake until continuous land fillings transformed it into a narrow strait during the 18th century. (See Stadshusbron for further details.) Several local streets and other structures are still named after the small island Blekholmen once located here and today part of the eastern shore.

== See also ==
- Geography of Stockholm
- History of Stockholm
