= Serafimerlasarettet =

Hospital in Stockholm, Sweden

Serafimerlasarettet (Seraphim Hospital), popularly known as Serafen, was the first modern hospital in Sweden. It was located in Kungsholmen in Stockholm and active from 1752 to 1980. The current building still houses the local emergency department of Serafen.

The hospital is mentioned in Carl Michael Bellman's 1790 song "Ge rum i Bröllopsgåln din hund!", Fredman's Epistle no. 40, where even the priest at the wedding party steals from the collection meant for the hospital; and in Epistle 48, "Solen glimmar blank och trind", where it is one of the sights seen from Ulla Winblad's boat as she returns from Hessingen in Lake Mälaren to Stockholm.

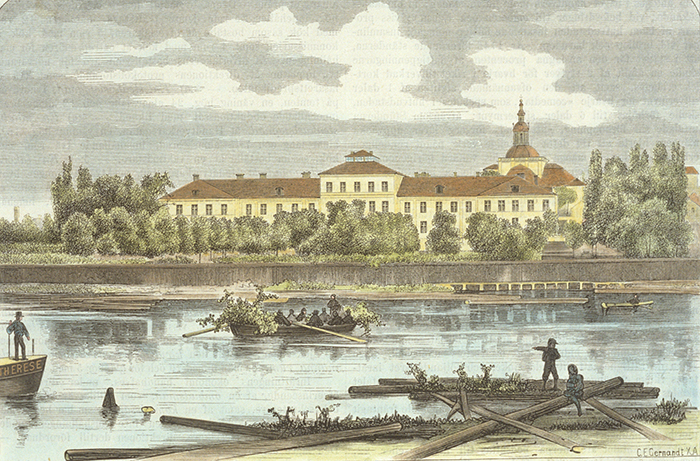
The Serafimerlasarettet as it looked in 1868, from across Klara Sjö

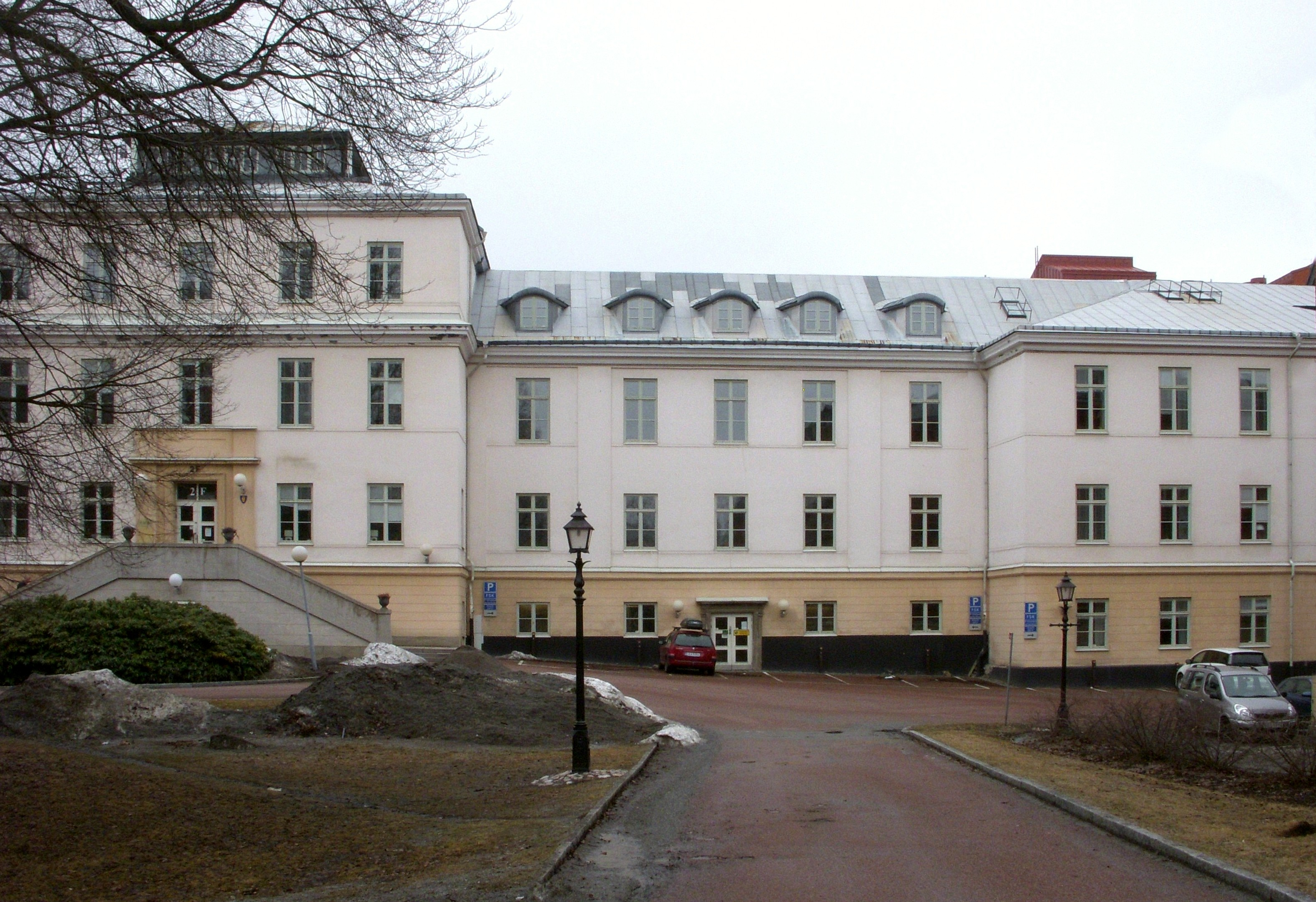
The original hospital building, Hornska huset, purchased 1749

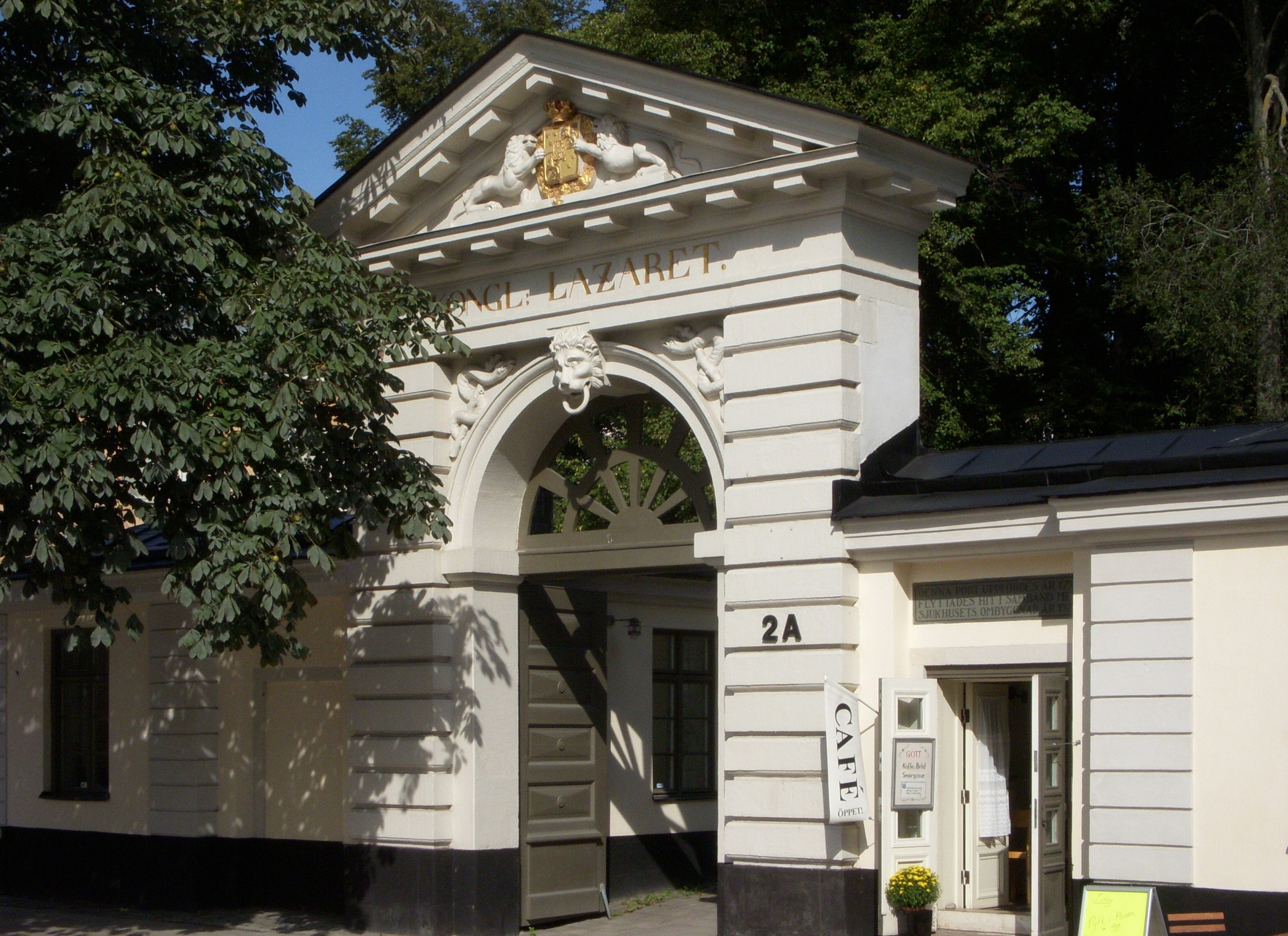
The hospital gate, built 1792
