= Mariedal =

- Location within Stockholm Location within Sweden
- Coordinates: 59°34′N 17°41′E
- Country: Sweden
- Province: Uppland
- County: Stockholm County
- Municipality: Upplands-Bro Municipality

Area
  - Total: 0.74 km^{2} (0.29 sq mi)

Population (31 December 2010)
  - Total: 297
  - Density: 402/km^{2} (1,040/sq mi)
- Time zone: UTC+1 (CET)
  - Summer (DST): UTC+2 (CEST)

Mariedal is a locality situated in Upplands-Bro Municipality, Stockholm County, Sweden with 297 inhabitants in 2010.
