= Stadshusbron =

Bridge in central Stockholm, Sweden

Coordinates: 59°19′40″N 18°03′21″E

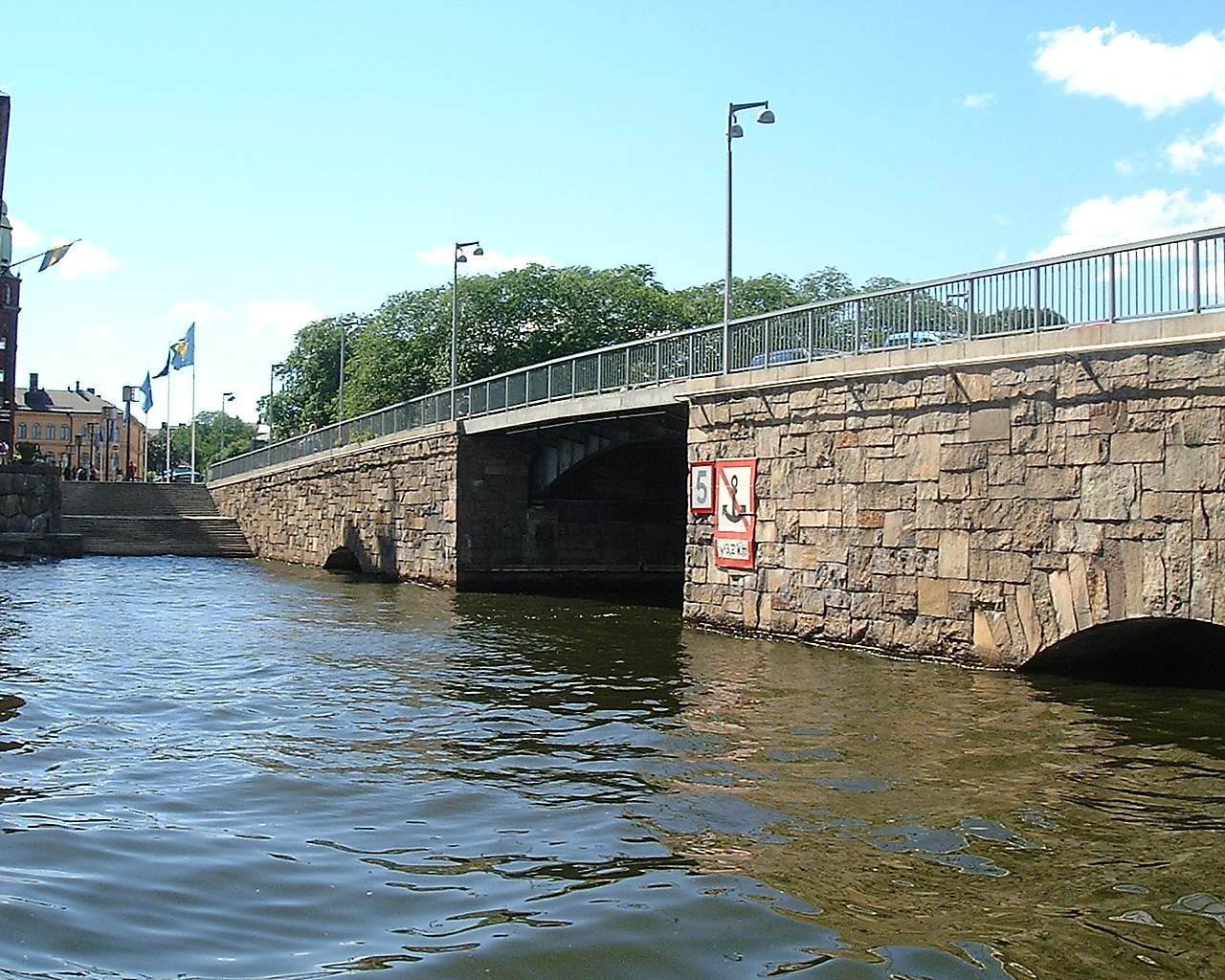
Stadshusbron viewed from a quay facing Riddarfjärden.

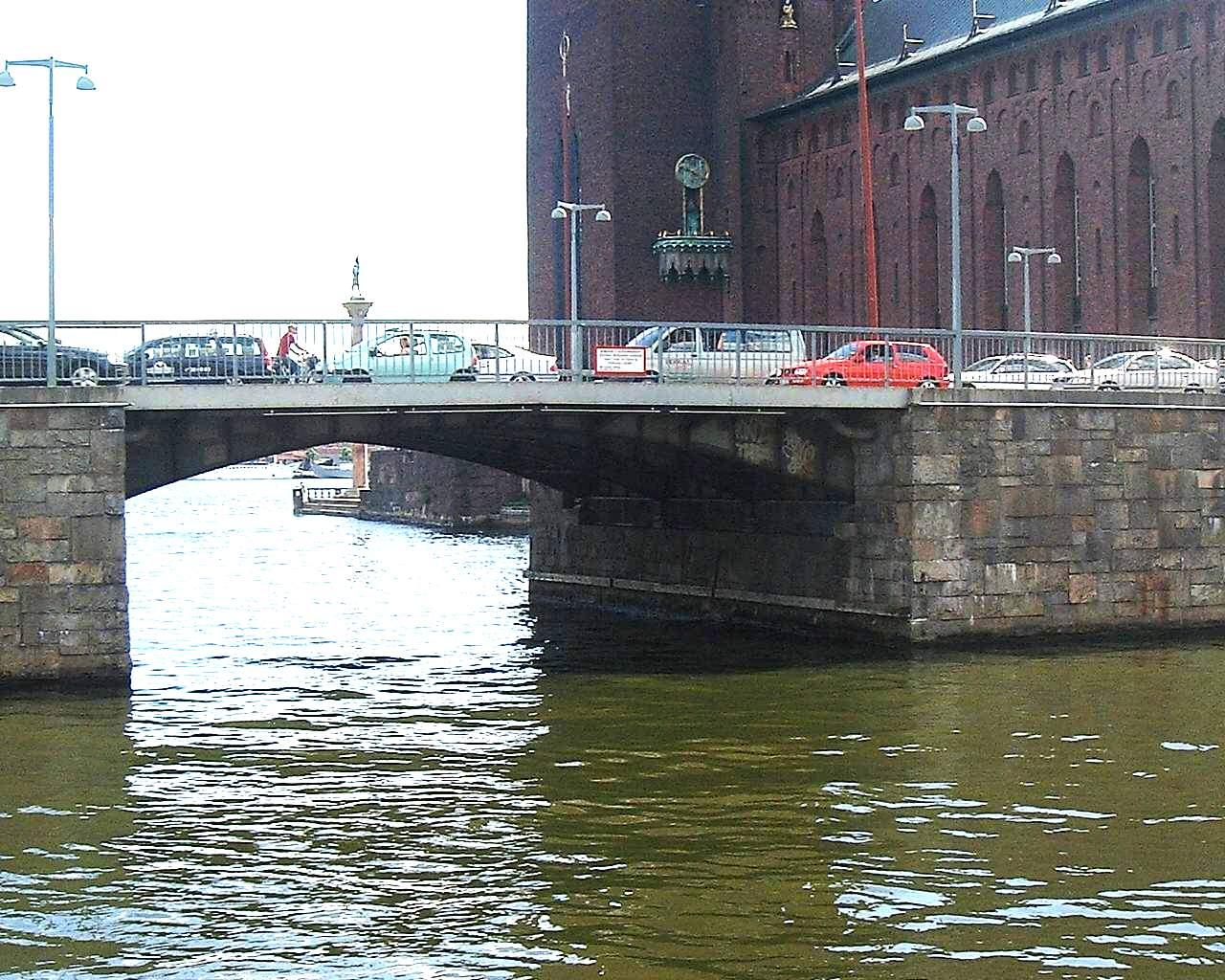
View of the now permanently closed drawbridge from north with the City hall in the background.

Stadshusbron (Swedish: "The City Hall Bridge"), formerly known as Nya Kungsholmsbron ("The New Kungsholm Bridge") is a bridge in central Stockholm, Sweden located just north of the Stockholm City Hall. Stretching over Klara sjö ("Lake Klara"), it connects mainland Norrmalm on the eastern shore to the island Kungsholmen on the western shore.

Strong population growth on Kungsholmen caused a first bridge to be built on the location in 1669–1672. It was a 500 metres long pontoon bridge forming an angle on the southern side of the strait, at the time presumably the longest bridge in Europe. It was rebuilt first in 1709 and a second time in 1766–1772. By that time, however, the strait had been made considerably narrower by land fillings. The original bridge was replaced by a steel swing bridge in 1868. In connection to the construction of the City Hall in 1917–1919, the present 19 metres wide double-leafed drawbridge was built. The drawbridge was finally closed in 1949.

== See also ==
- List of bridges in Stockholm
- Klarabergsviadukten
- Blekholmsbron
- Kungsbron
- Barnhusbron
