= Barnhusviken =

Body of water in central Stockholm, Sweden

Coordinates: 59°20′05″N 18°02′53″E

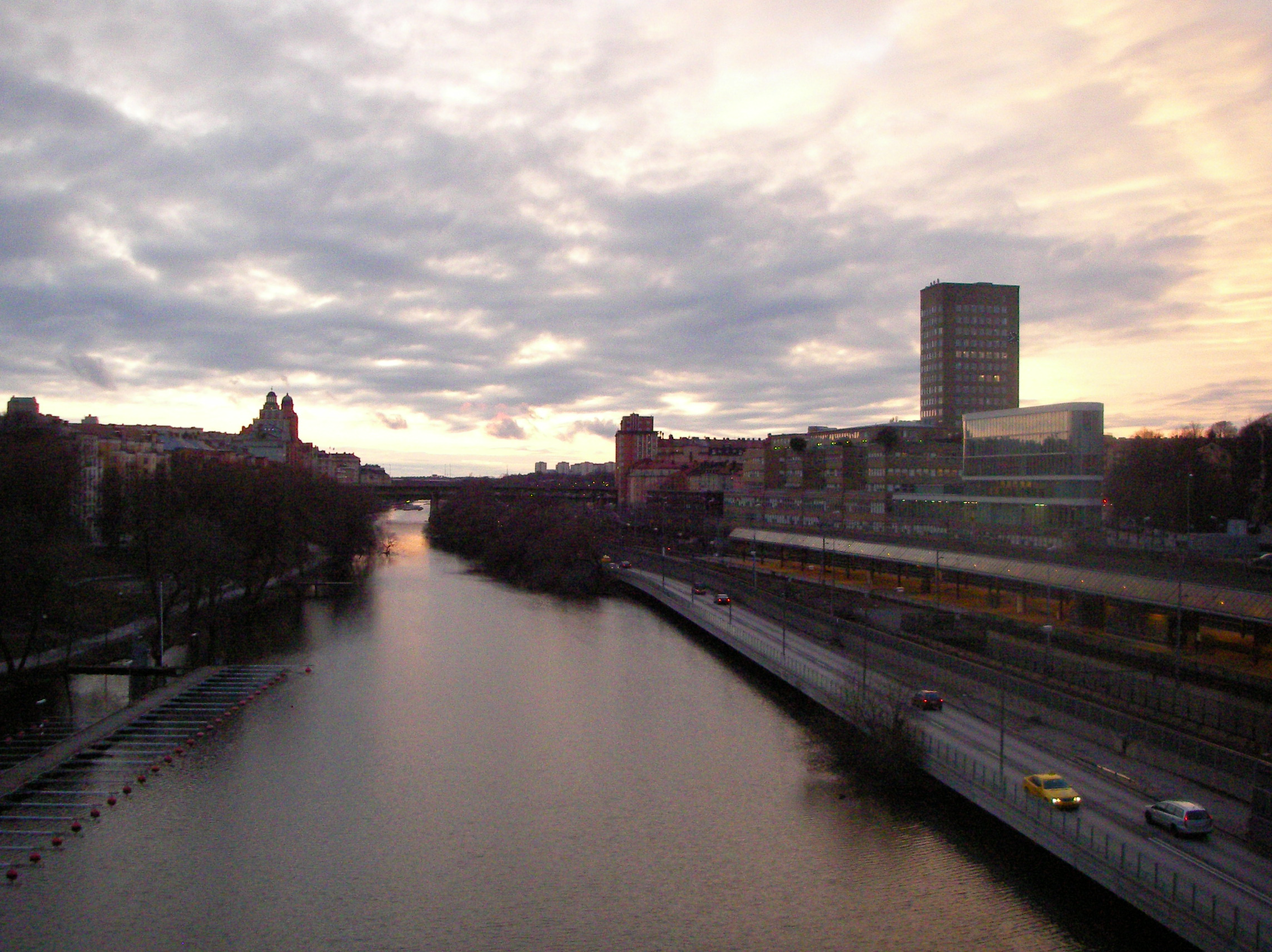
Barnhusviken from Barnhusbron.

Barnhusviken (Swedish for "the Orphanage Bay") is a body of water in central Stockholm, Sweden. Separating the island Kungsholmen from the mainland district Norrmalm north of it, it connects Karlbergssjön to Klara Sjö.

Together with Karlbergskanalen, Karlbergssjön, and Klara Sjö, Barnhusviken constitutes the nameless body of water which separates Kungsholmen from the city districts Norrmalm and Vasastaden and the northern suburb Solna.

The northern shore, entirely occupied by the Klarastrandsleden motorway and eight rows of railway tracks, is not accessible to pedestrians, but, in contrast, the southern shore offers a section of the walk stretching some 2 km from the City Hall and all the way along the northern shore of Kungsholmen.

== About the name ==
Just like the bridge Barnhusbron spanning across it and several other local structures, the former bay was named in the 1860s after an orphanage (barnhus, literally "children-house") relocated from Riddarholmen to the neighbourhood on its northern shore in the 1630s.

It is called a bay simply because it used to be a bay before continuous land filling transformed it into the narrow canal it is today. On maps from the early 19th century it is labelled Rörstrandssjön ("Lake of Rörstrand") after the vicinity to the porcelain factory of Rörstrand.

== Notable buildings ==
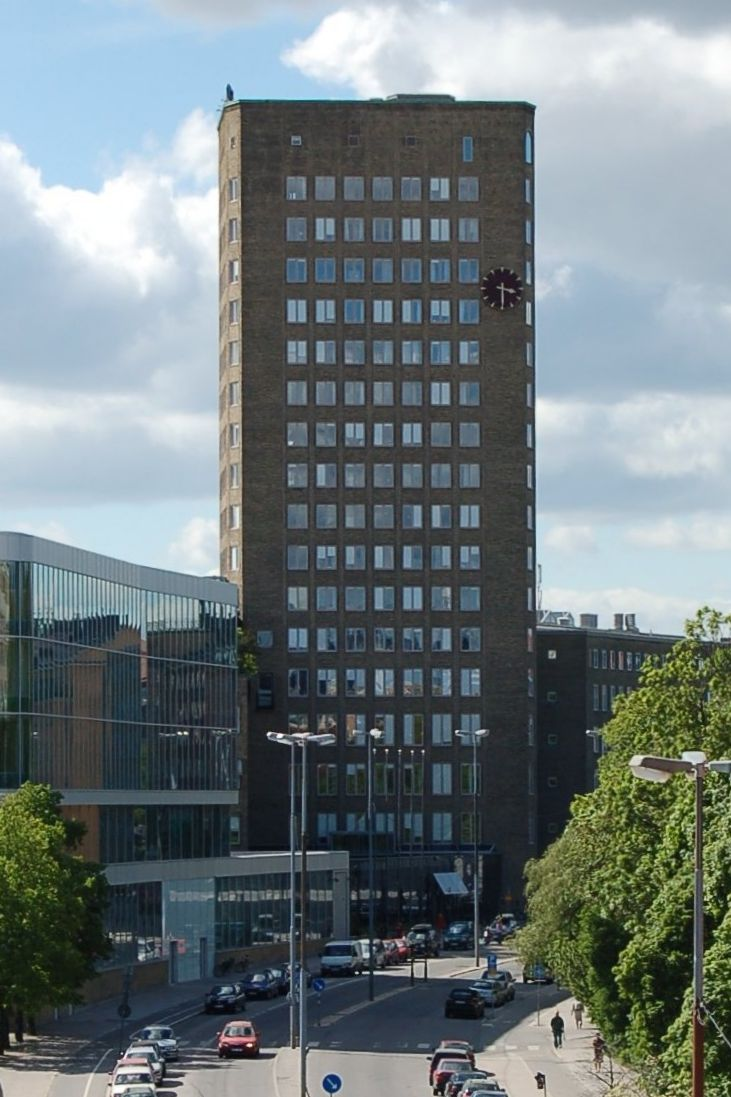
The Bonnier Tower.

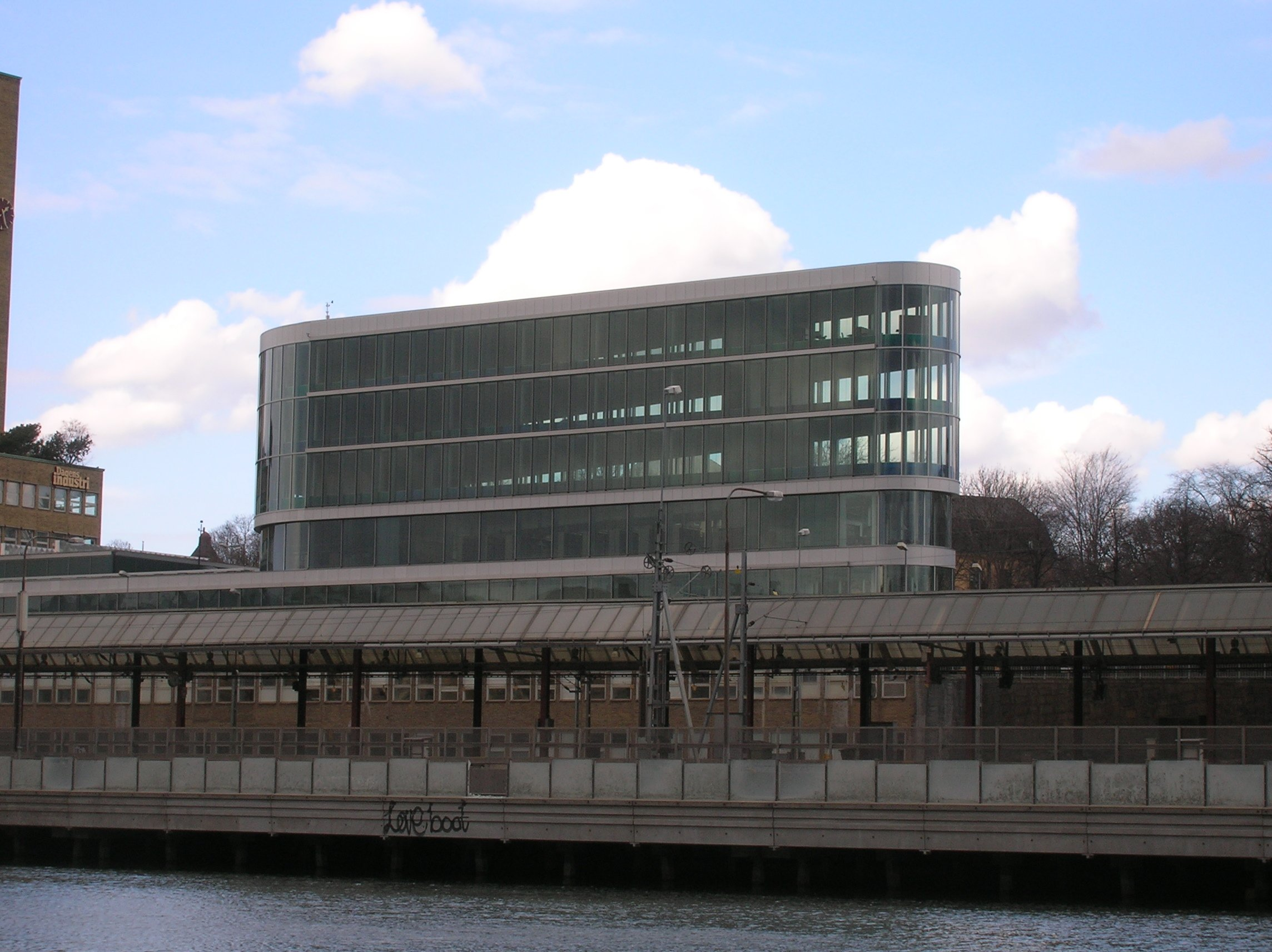
Bonniers Konsthall.

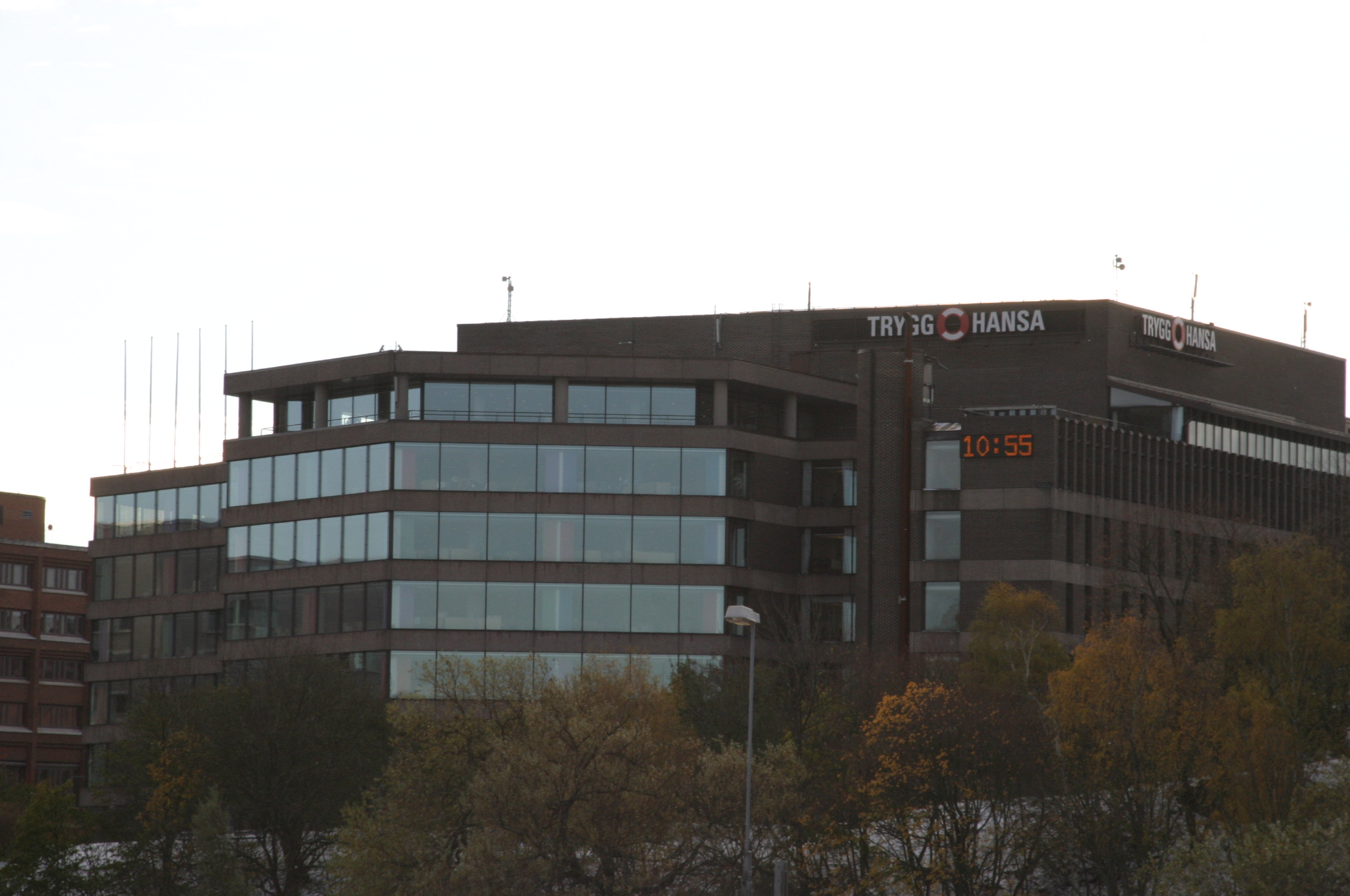
Trygg Hansa, Nov 2006.

Several prominent buildings line-up along the shores of Barnhusviken:

- On the northern shore is the Bonnier Tower, the skyscraper of the headquarters of Bonnier media group, designed be architects Anders and Ivar Tengbom and during the period 1949-1958 the tallest building in Stockholm. Next to it is the Bonniers Konsthall, designed by Johan Celsing and inaugurated in 2006.
- On the southern shore is the St Erik Area, a prestigious residential area build during the second half of the 1990s in a style imitating the Nordic Classicism prevalent in Sweden during the 1920s. The area is dominated by the huge flight of stairs leading down to the waterfront. While this project has been much criticized by architects as an outdated Disneyfication and New urbanism at its worst, the green space below this monumental staircase has proven very popular among the numerous feral domestic rabbits who, since they started to spread from Solna in the mid-1980s, are giving the area a reputation.
- Between the St Erik Area and the bridge is the headquarters of the insurance company Trygg Hansa, built 1967–76, and on the opposite side of the bridge Tekniska nämndhuset, a huge brick complex built 1962–65 to house some 1.200 white-collar workers of the Stockholm City Planning Administration and various city committees. A matching addition facing the continuation of the bridge was made for the Stockholm District Court in 1984–86.

== See also ==
- Geography of Stockholm
- History of Stockholm
