= Kungsbron =

Double bridge in central Stockholm, Sweden

Coordinates: 59°19′56.7″N 18°03′00.9″E

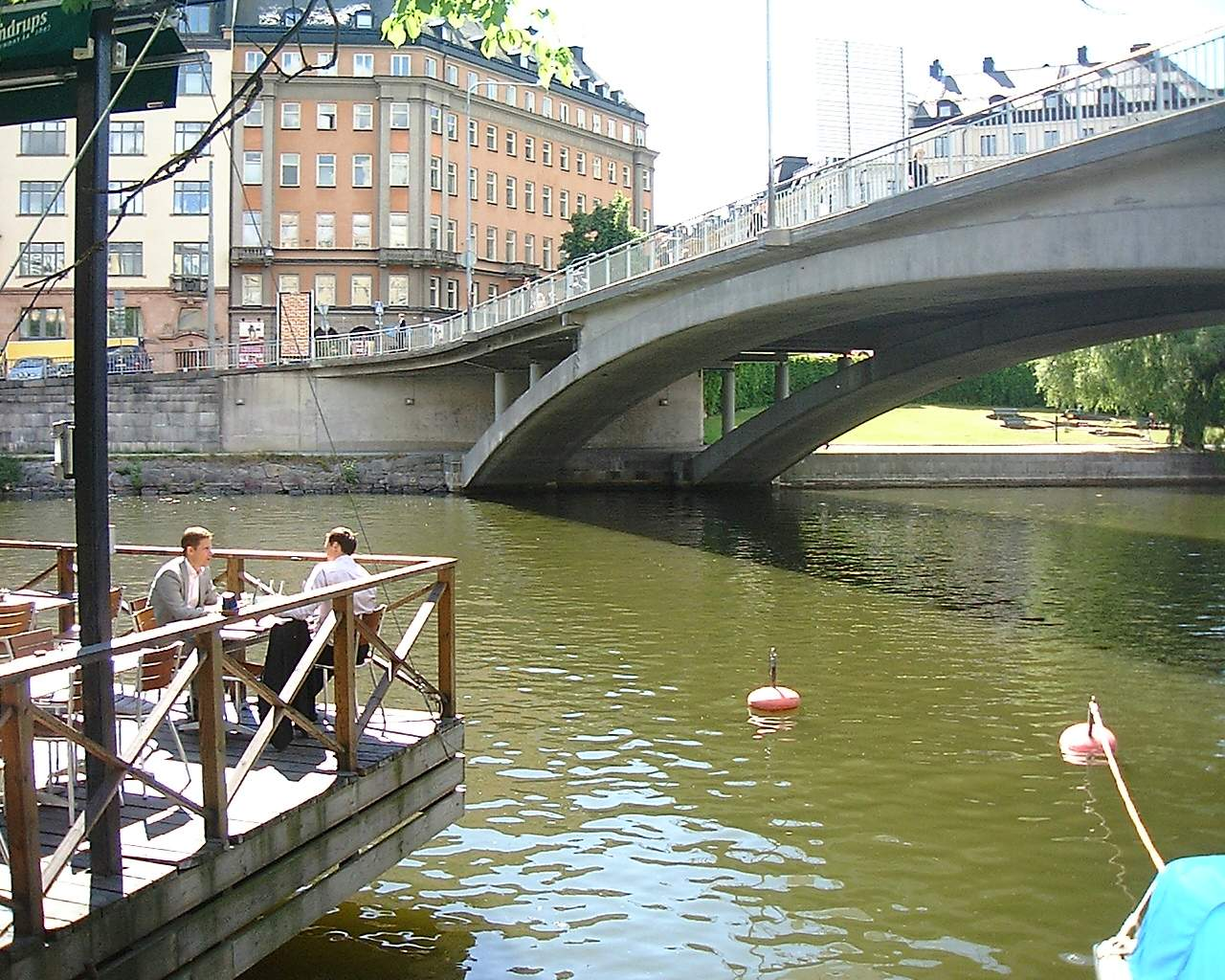
Kungsbron viewed from Norrmalm.

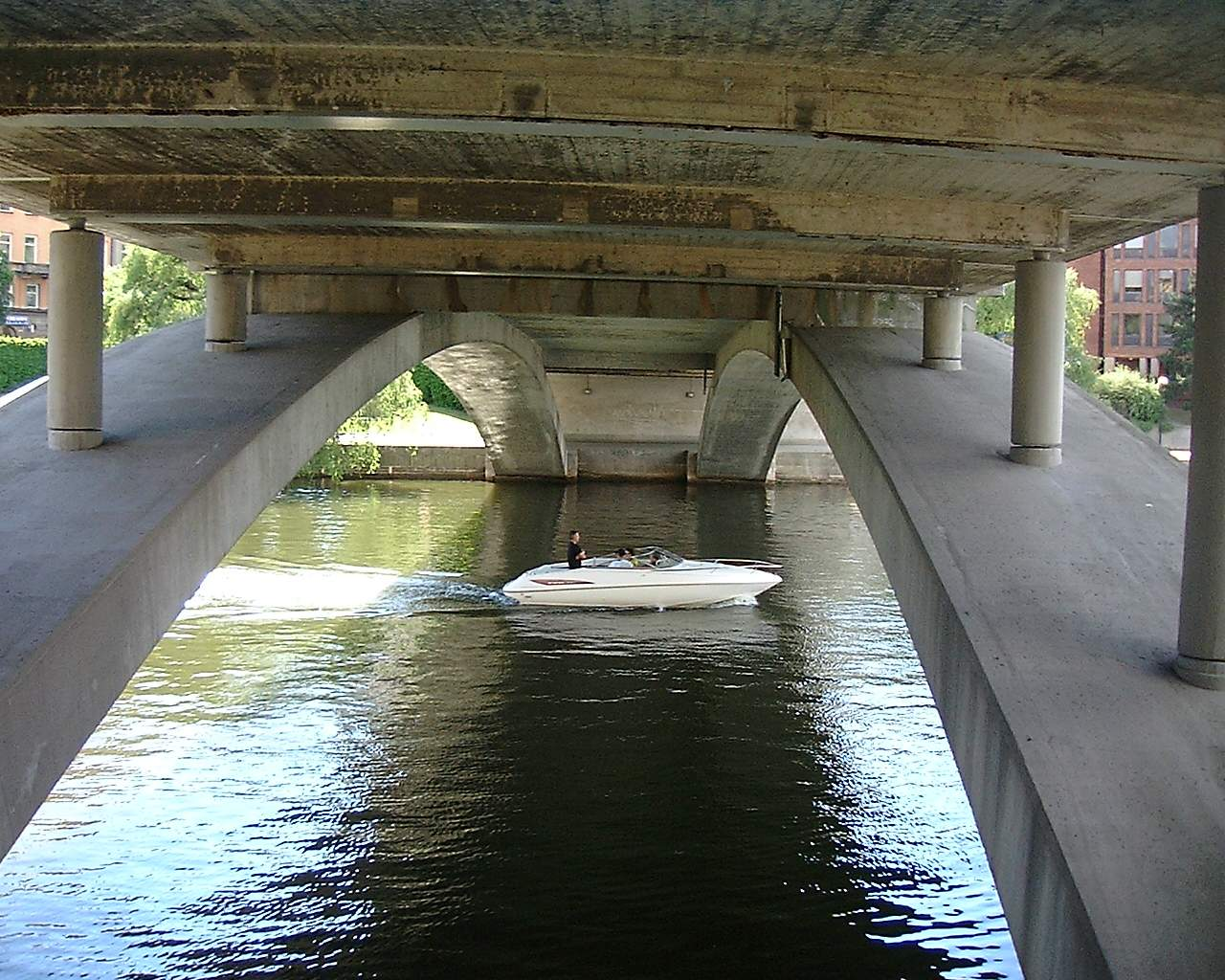
A boat passing through Lake Klara.

Kungsbron (Swedish: "King's Bridge") is a double bridge in central Stockholm, Sweden. Stretching over Klara Sjö, it connects Norrmalm to Kungsholmen.

== History ==
In 1881, an old wooden bridge spanning Klara sjö ("Lake Klara") was replaced by a 10,7 metres wide steel swing bridge, hand-driven until electricity in 1906 made operation of the bridge three times faster.

A steel two-hinged arch bridge with a single span of 42 metres was added in 1907 stretching over the older bridge. This second bridge was repaired in 1930-1933 and 1952–1953.

The swing bridge was replaced in 1944 by two one-way concrete arch bridges, each 14 metres wide with a maximum span of 68 metres.

The bridge(s) forms the continuation of Kungsgatan ("King Street"), which was given its name in 1881, most likely chosen because it crosses Drottninggatan ("Queen Street").

== Gallery ==
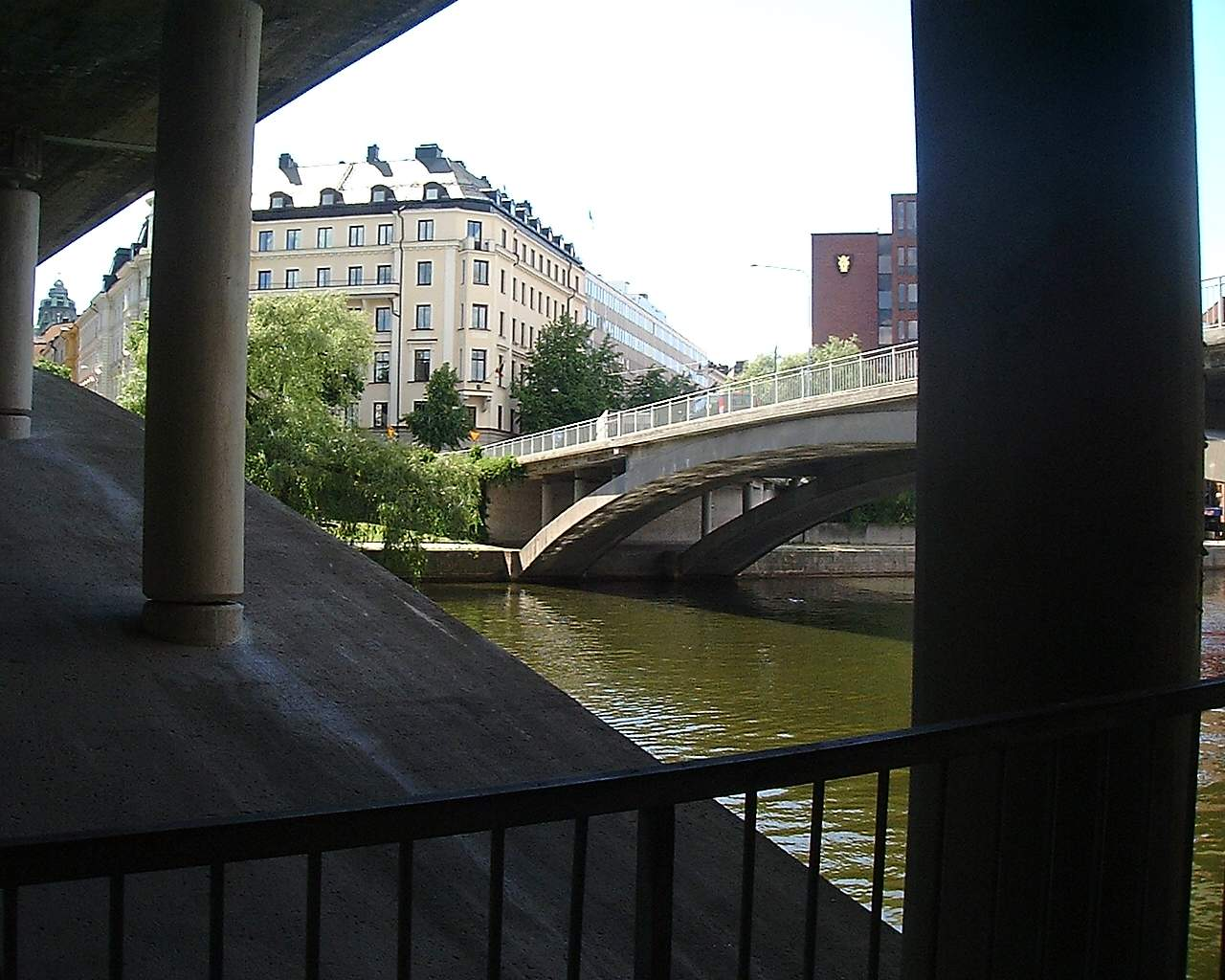
Northern bridge viewed from the southern.

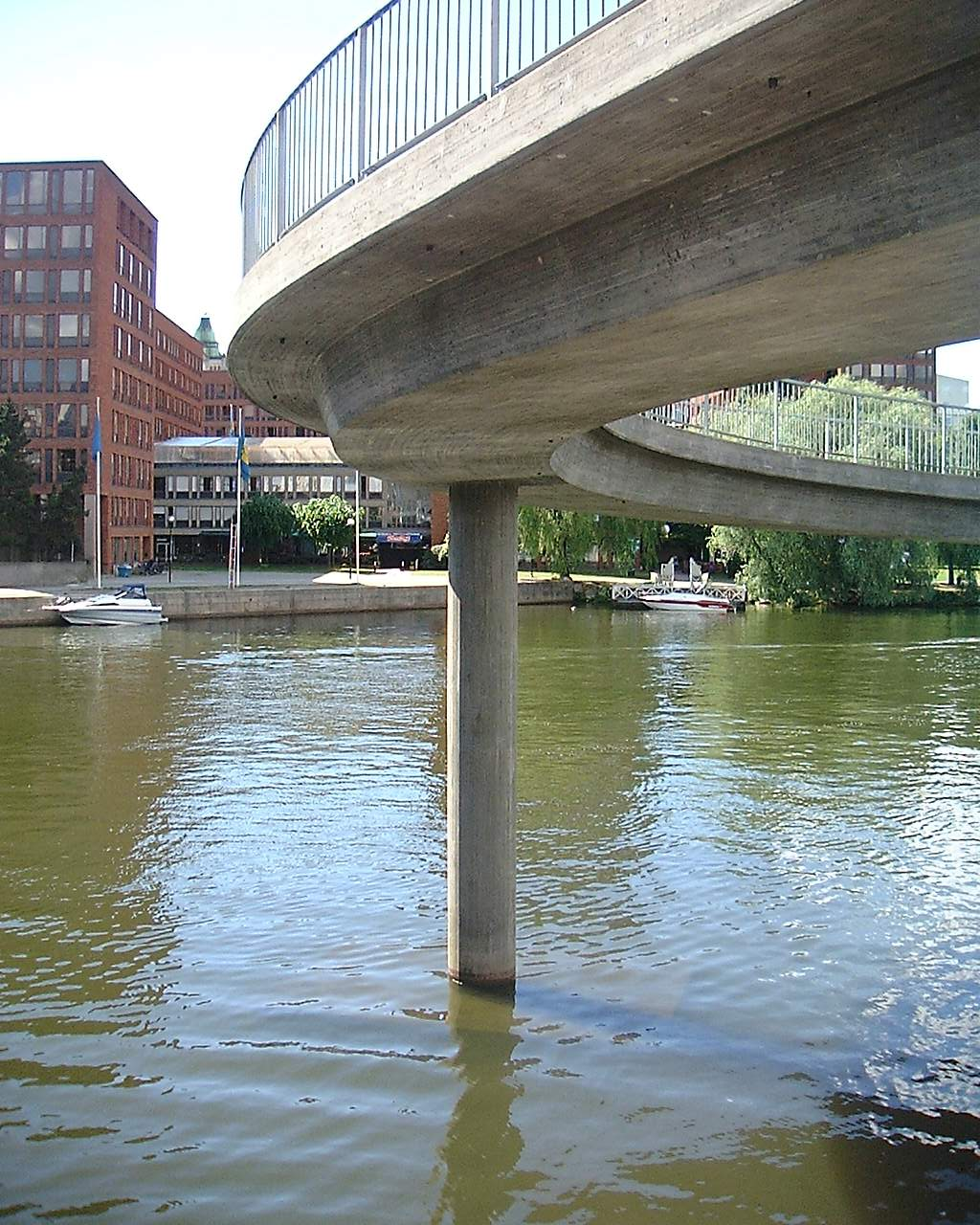
A pillar supporting the circular pedestrian bridge.

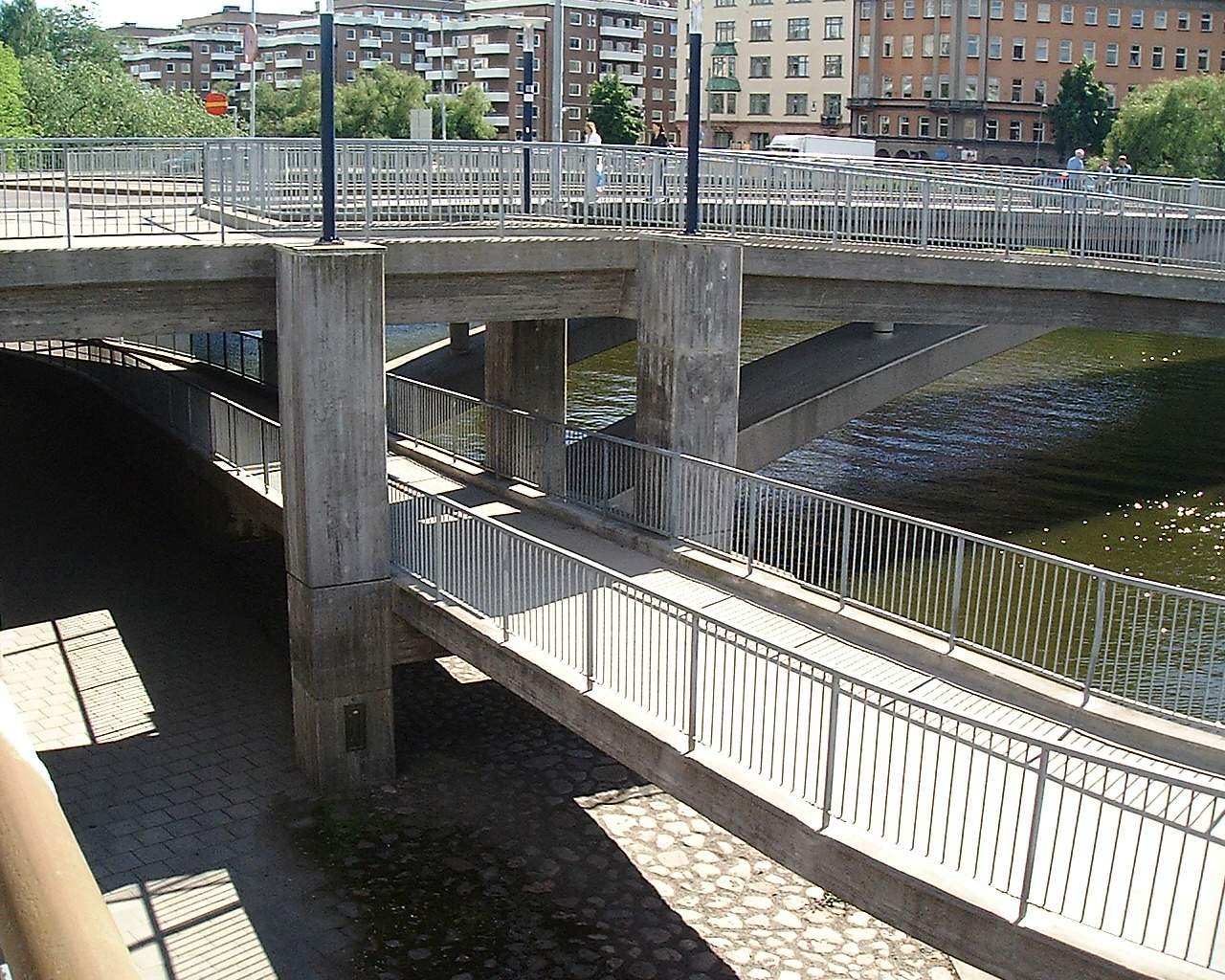
Concrete structures on the eastern side.

== See also ==
- List of bridges in Stockholm
- Stadshusbron
- Klarabergsviadukten
- Barnhusbron
- Sankt Eriksbron
