= Djurgårdsbrunnsviken =

Body of water in Stockholm, Sweden

Coordinates: 59°19′52″N 18°06′32″E

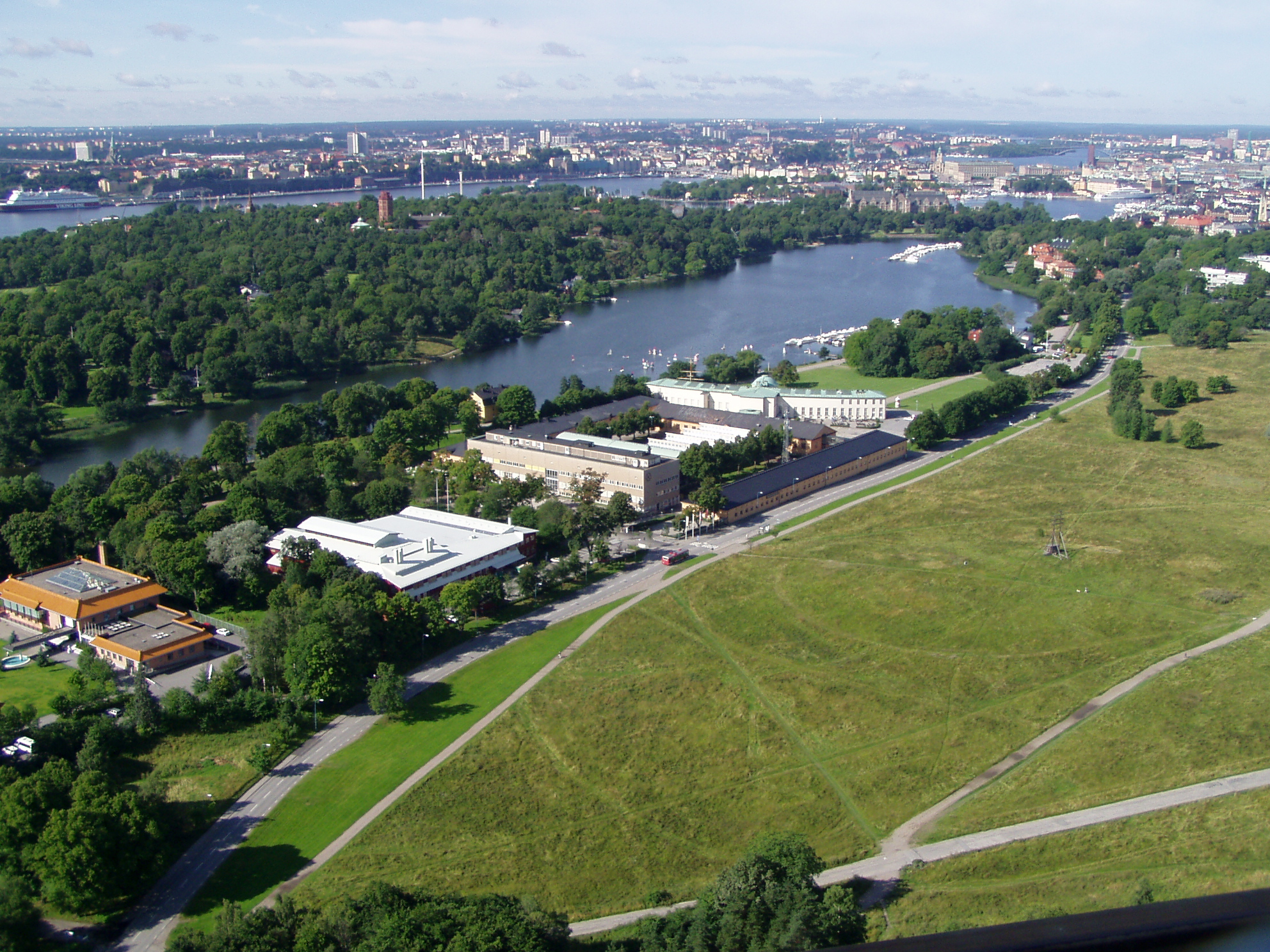
Djurgårdsbrunnsviken as viewed from the tower Kaknästornet facing south-west.

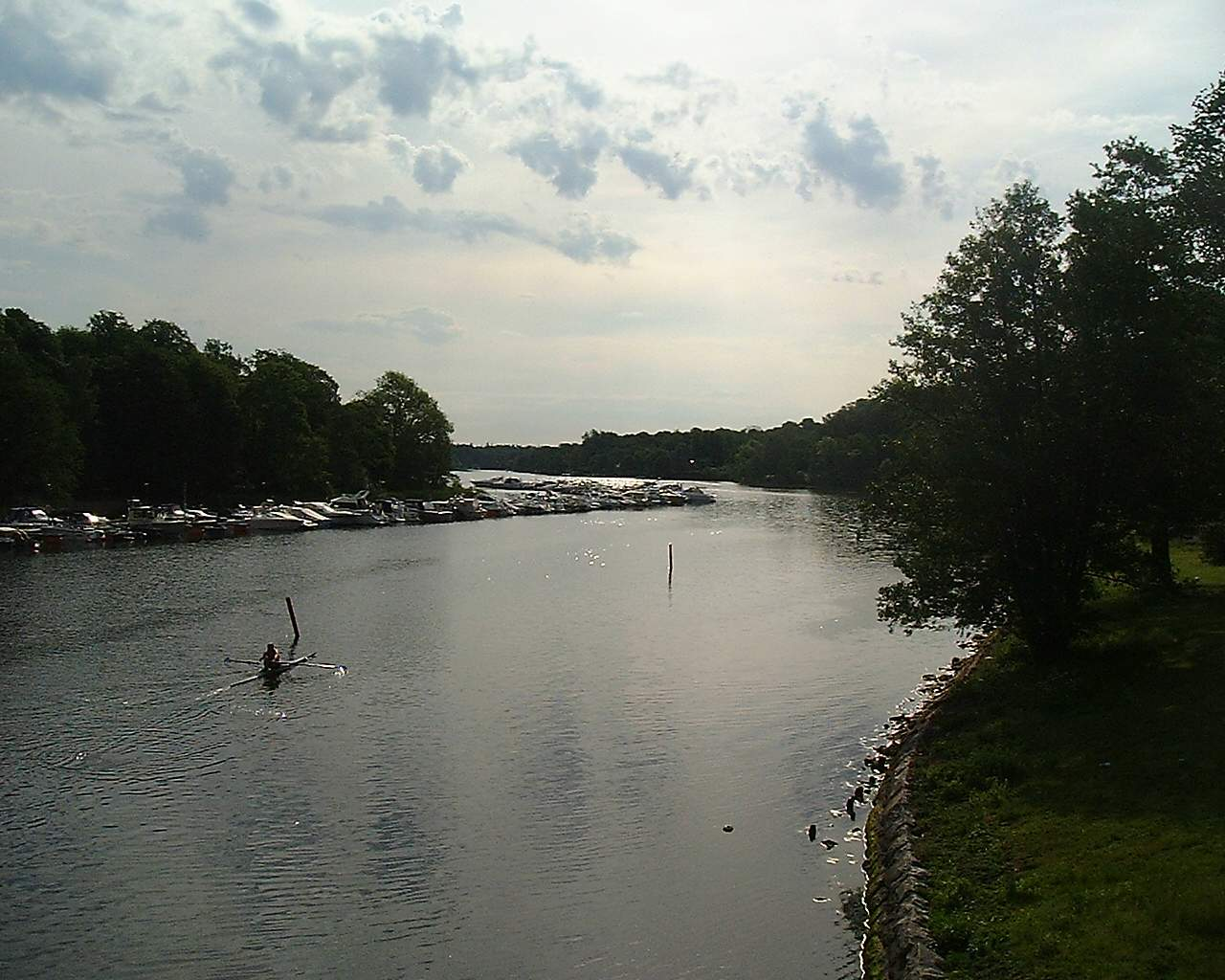
Viewed from Djurgårdsbron.

Djurgårdsbrunnsviken is a bay in central Stockholm, Sweden, together with the canal Djurgårdsbrunnskanalen forming the northern shore line of the island Djurgården (or more correctly between Northern and Southern Djurgården). The bridge Djurgårdsbron stretches over the bay.

Old names
Ladugårdsviken (17th-18th centuries), Surbrunnsviken, Södra brunnsviken

Historically known as a good fishing ground, Djurgårdsbrunnsviken, also known as the Bay of Sweden, is today popular for bathing in summer. The bay was used for the diving, swimming (including the part for the modern pentathlon event), water polo and rowing competitions during the 1912 Summer Olympics, and during the Swedish championship 1930.

On the north shore of the bay are a great number of embassies and several museums, including The National Maritime Museum (Sjöhistoriska museet), the Ethnographical Museum (Etnografiska museet), and the Technical Museum (Tekniska museet). On the south shore are the open-air museum Skansen, the Rosendal Palace (Rosendals slott).

== See also ==
- Djurgårdsbrunnsbron
- Lilla Sjötullsbron
- Geography of Stockholm
- Royal National City Park
