= Skansens bergbana =

Swedish funicular railway

Coordinates: 59°19′39″N 18°05′58″E

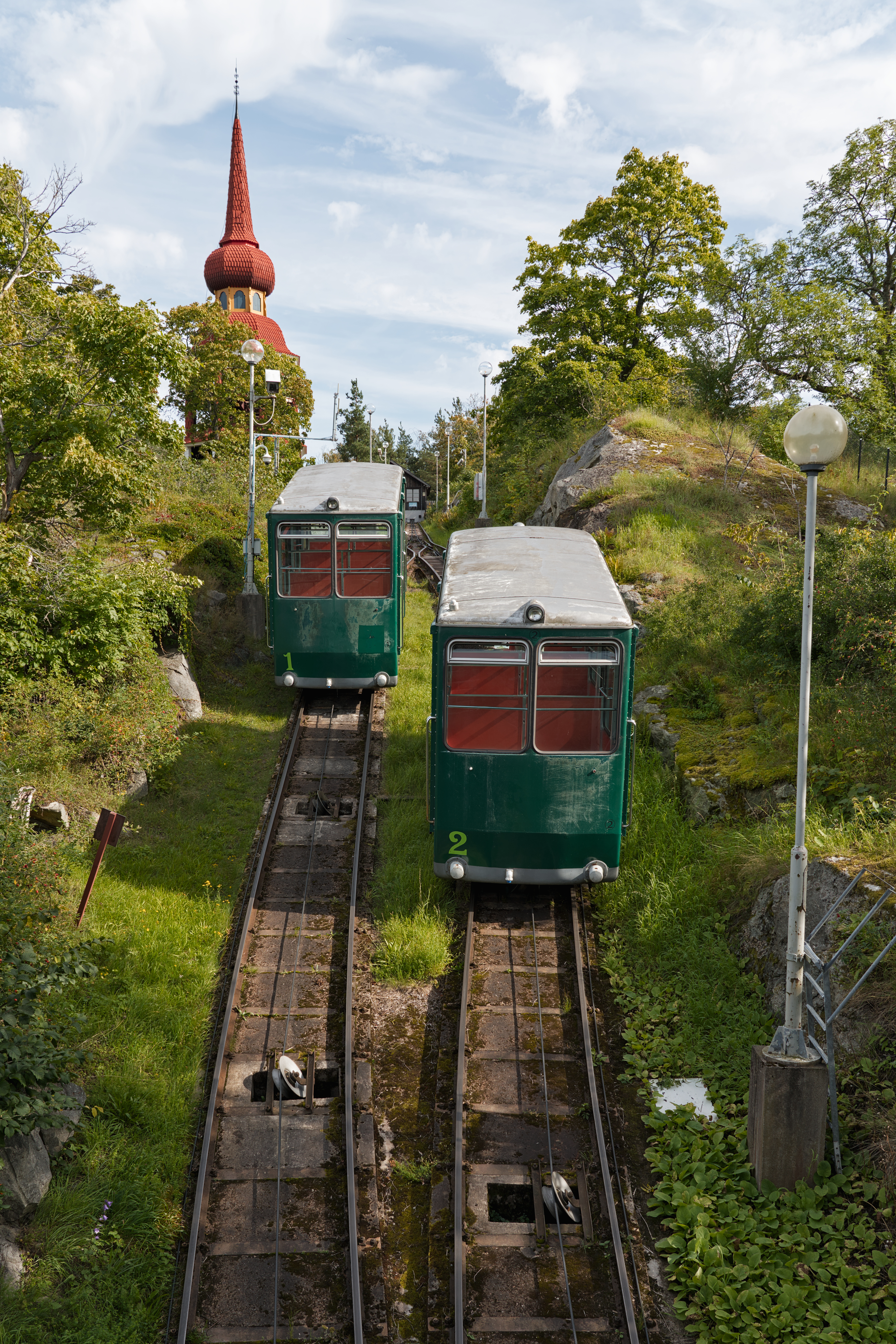
The passing loop

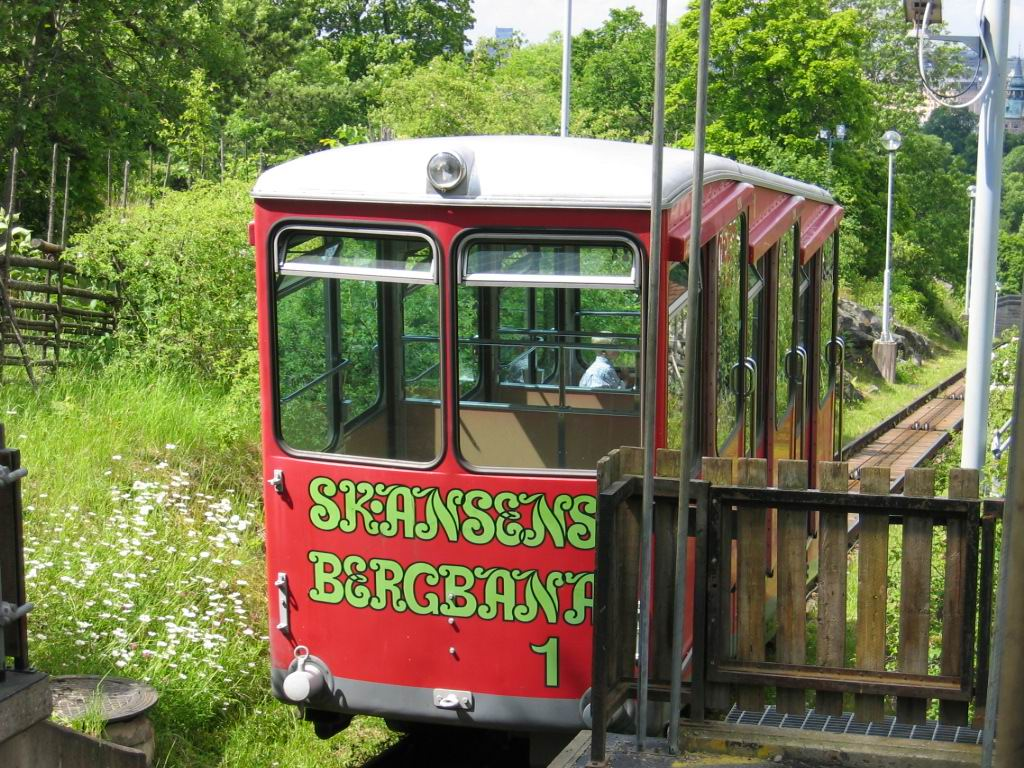
One of the cars in 2005

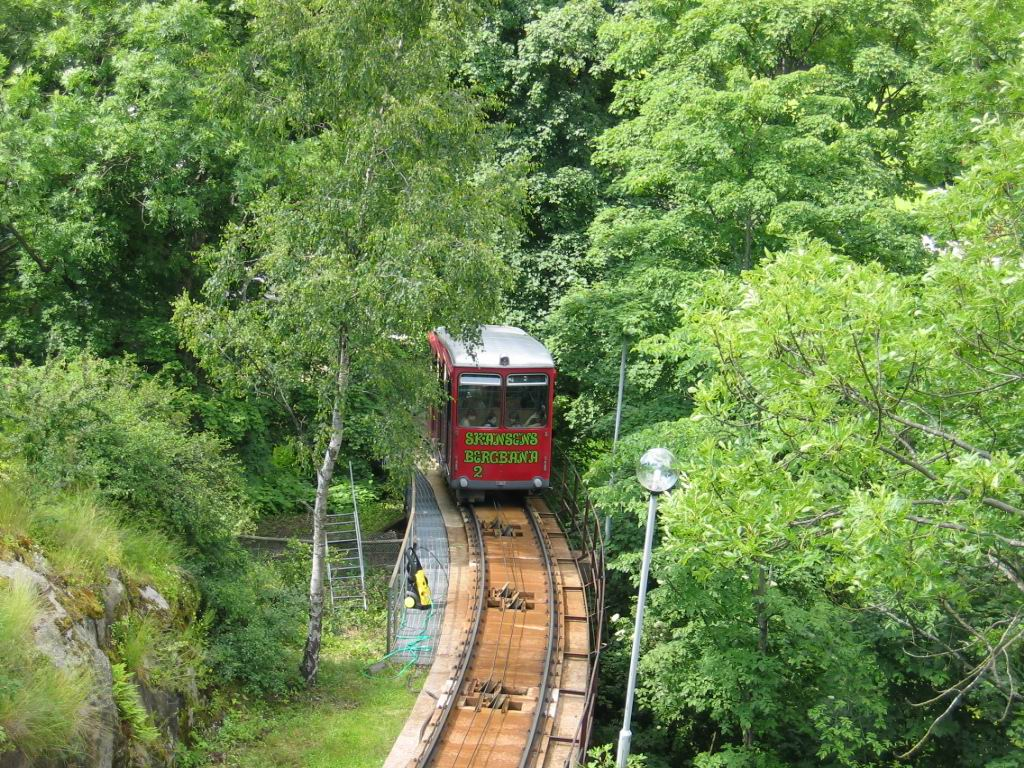
The line

The Skansens Bergbana is a funicular railway in the Skansen open-air museum and zoo, located on the island of Djurgården in Stockholm, Sweden.

The Bergbana was built on the northwest side of the Skansen hill for the Stockholm Exhibition of 1897, by Von Roll. The railway was single-track with a passing siding and had a rise of 30 meters (98 ft) over a total length of 107 meters (351 ft), giving a grade varying from 25% to 34%. Service was provided by small 16 seat cars. The funicular was in daily operation until the 1940s, and in summer only operation until it completely closed in 1959. During the 1970s the railway was restored and slightly extended, reopening in 1973. Von Roll again supplied the equipment, including new and larger cars.

The funicular has the following technical parameters:

- Length: 196.4 meters (644 ft)
- Height: 34.67 meters (114 ft)
- Maximum steepness: 24.7 %
- Capacity: 45 people per car
- Trip time: 90 seconds
- Maximum speed: 2.5 meters per second (8.20 ft/s)
- Configuration: single track with passing loop
- Track gauge: 1,000 mm (3 ft 3 3/8 in)
- Traction: Electricity

== See also ==
- List of funicular railways
