= Stockholm Exhibition =

Stockholm Exhibition may refer to:

- General Art and Industrial Exposition of Stockholm (1897)
- Stockholm Exhibition (1930)
