= Beckholmsbron =

Wooden bridge in Stockholm, Sweden

Coordinates: 59°19′19.2″N 18°6′7.4″E

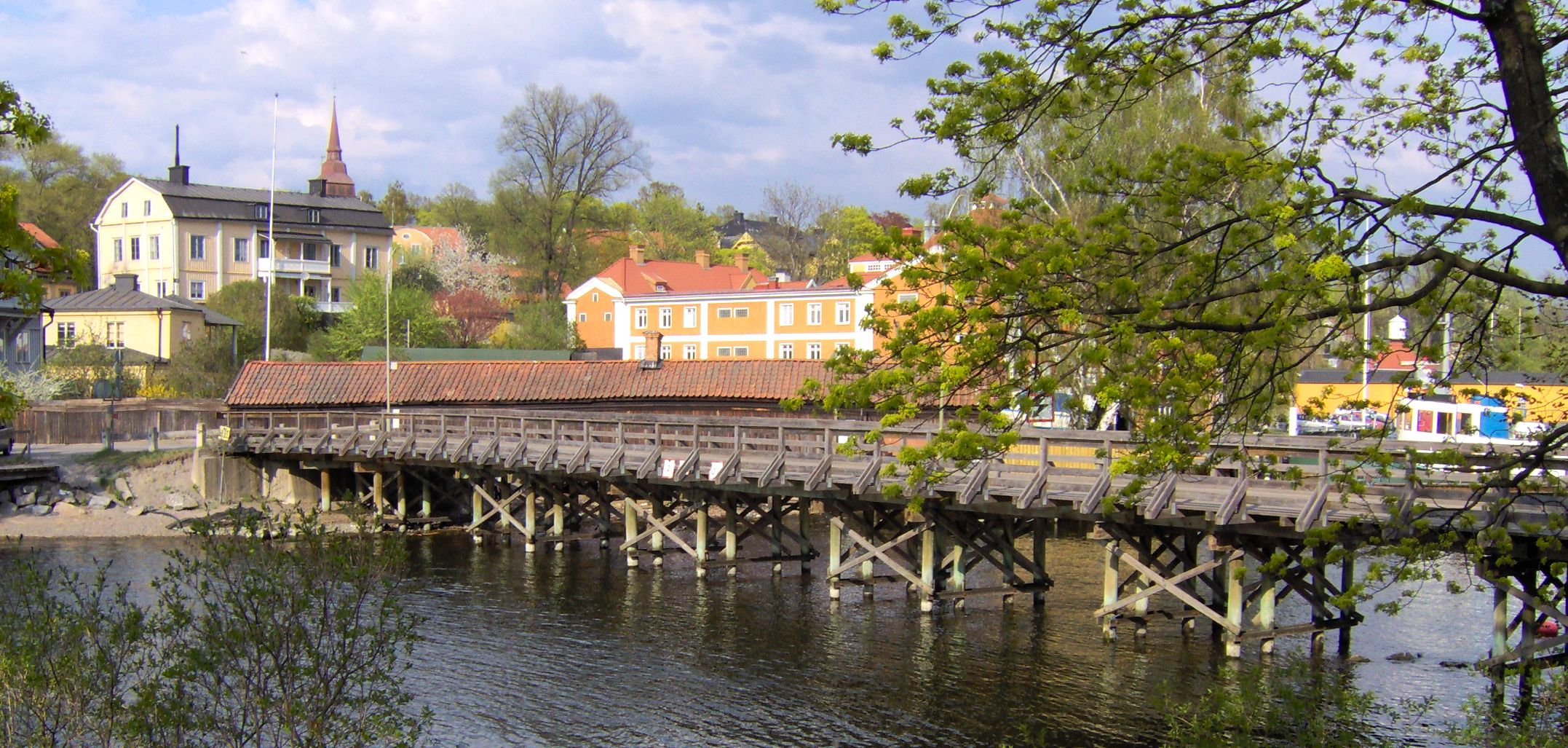
Beckholmsbron, 2006.

Beckholmsbron (Swedish: Beckholmen Bridge) is a wooden bridge in central Stockholm, Sweden, connecting the two islands Djurgården and Beckholmen.

Originally built in 1848–1858 when the first docks were constructed on Beckholmen, Beckholmsbron is the only remaining wooden bridge in Stockholm still used by heavy vehicles. It was repaired several times before the Royal Djurgården Administration had it rebuilt in 1992. The Stockholm City Museum have classified the bridge as a historical monument. The current name was made official in 1961.

After its completion in 1862 the bridge gradually started to rot and was finally proposed to be replaced by a concrete construction. Popular opinion, however, didn't approve with the decision and four engineers from the regiment in Södertälje instead had the present wooden bridge constructed in six weeks in 1992.

== See also ==
- List of bridges in Stockholm
- Djurgårdsbron
- Djurgårdsbrunnsbron
- Lilla Sjötullsbron
