= Djurgårdsbrunnskanalen =

Canal in central Stockholm, Sweden

Coordinates: 59°19′41″N 18°08′20″E

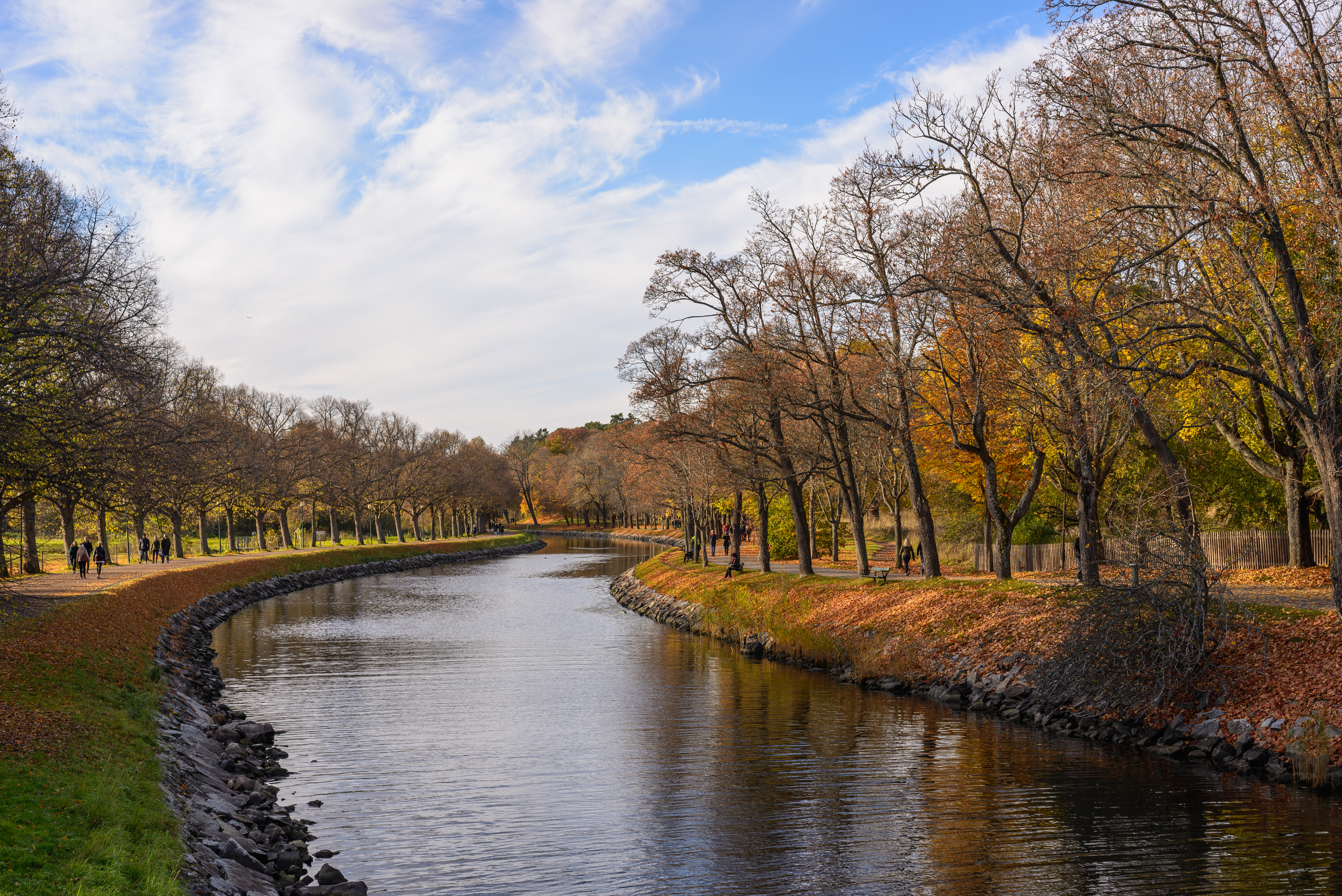
Djurgårdsbrunnskanalen.

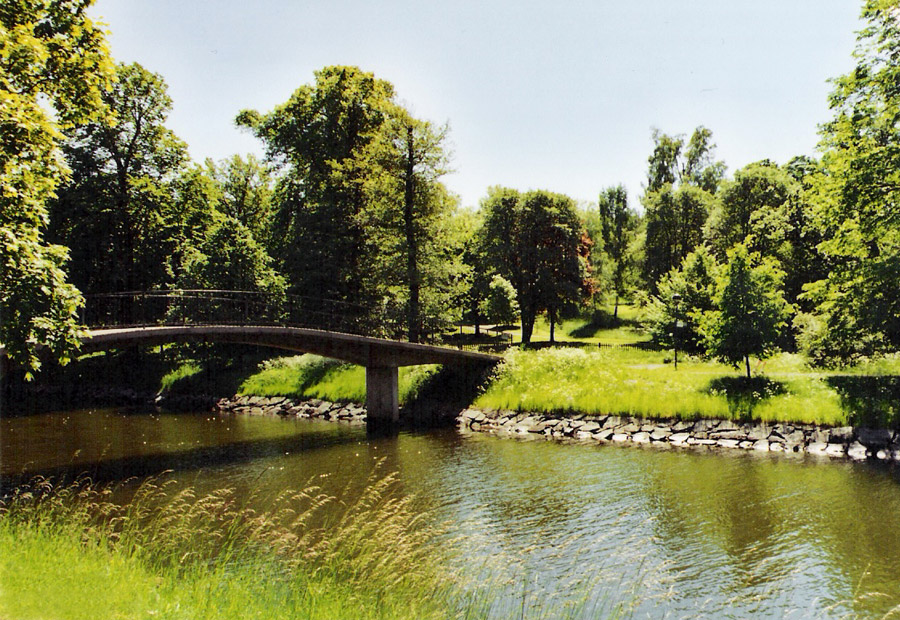
Lilla Sjötullsbron passing over Djurgårdsbrunnskanalen.

Djurgårdsbrunnskanalen (Swedish: "The Djurgården Well Canal") is a canal in central Stockholm, Sweden, separating the island Djurgården from the northern mainland (or more correctly Southern and Northern Djurgården).

The canal stretches one kilometre (0.6 mi) from Lilla Värtan to Djurgårdsbrunnsviken and allows ships 9.5 metres (31 ft) wide and 2.1 metres (6 ft 11 in) deep to pass. Two bridges pass over the canal: Djurgårdsbrunnsbron and Lilla Sjötullsbron.

The decision to build the canal was made by King Charles XIV in 1825. The canal was completed in 1834. It was built to make it easier for smaller ships with supplies to reach the center of Stockholm, but also for aesthetic reasons because Djurgården is a royal park.

== See also ==
- Geography of Stockholm
- Isbladskärret
