= Beckholmen =

Small island in central Stockholm, Sweden

Coordinates: 59°19′15″N 18°06′00″E

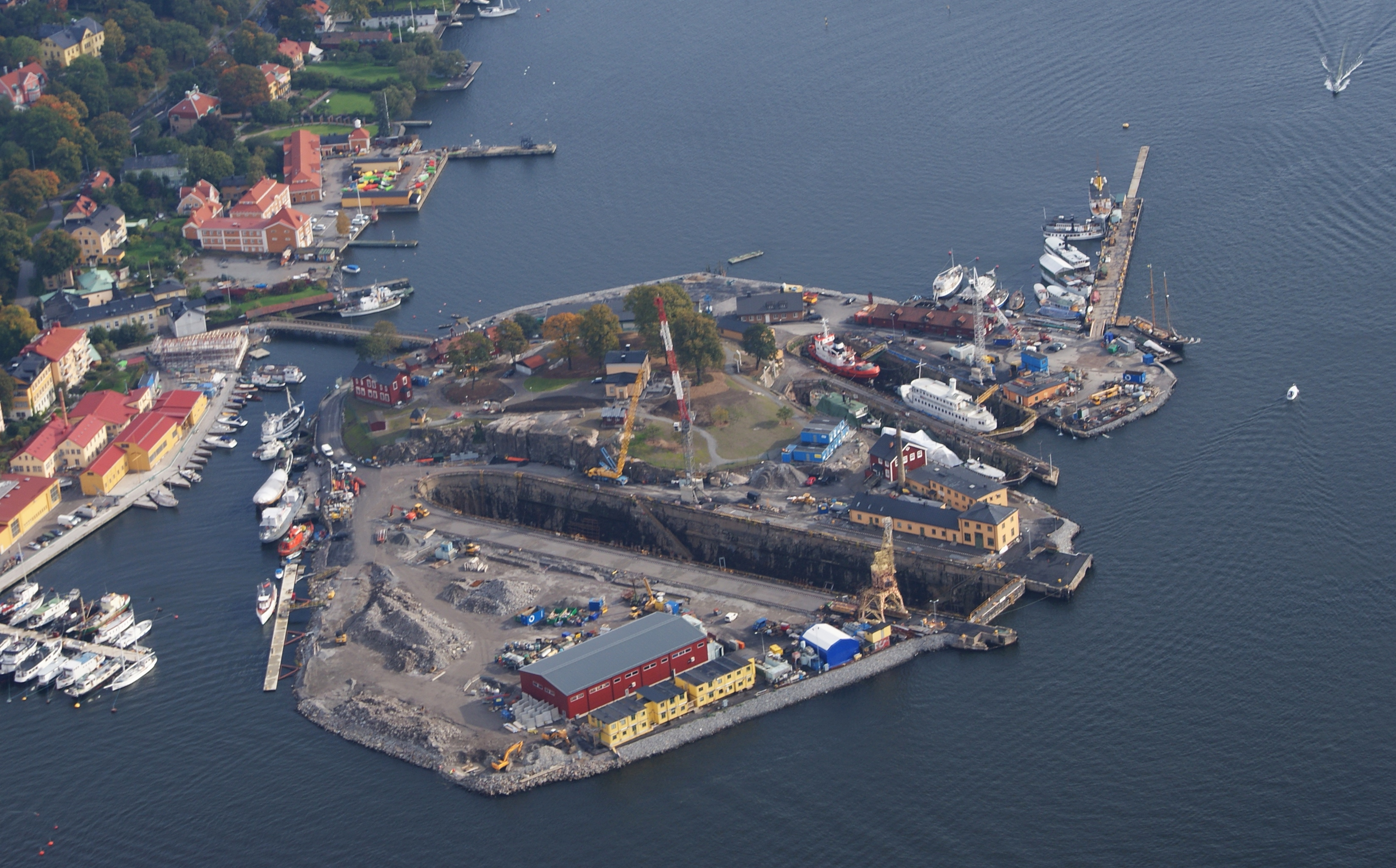
September 2012 serial view of Beckholmen

Beckholmen (Swedish: "Pitch Islet") is a small island in central Stockholm, Sweden. Having served the city's shipping industry for centuries, Beckholmen is now regarded as a historical monument of national interest, and, by its location just south of Djurgården in the vicinity of other similar localities (including Skeppsholmen, Kastellholmen, Djurgårdsvarvet, and Blasieholmen) it also forms part of Royal National City Park, and Stockholms Sjögård (literally, "Sea homestead of Stockholm"), an area of the harbour of Stockholm containing maritime environments of historical interest.

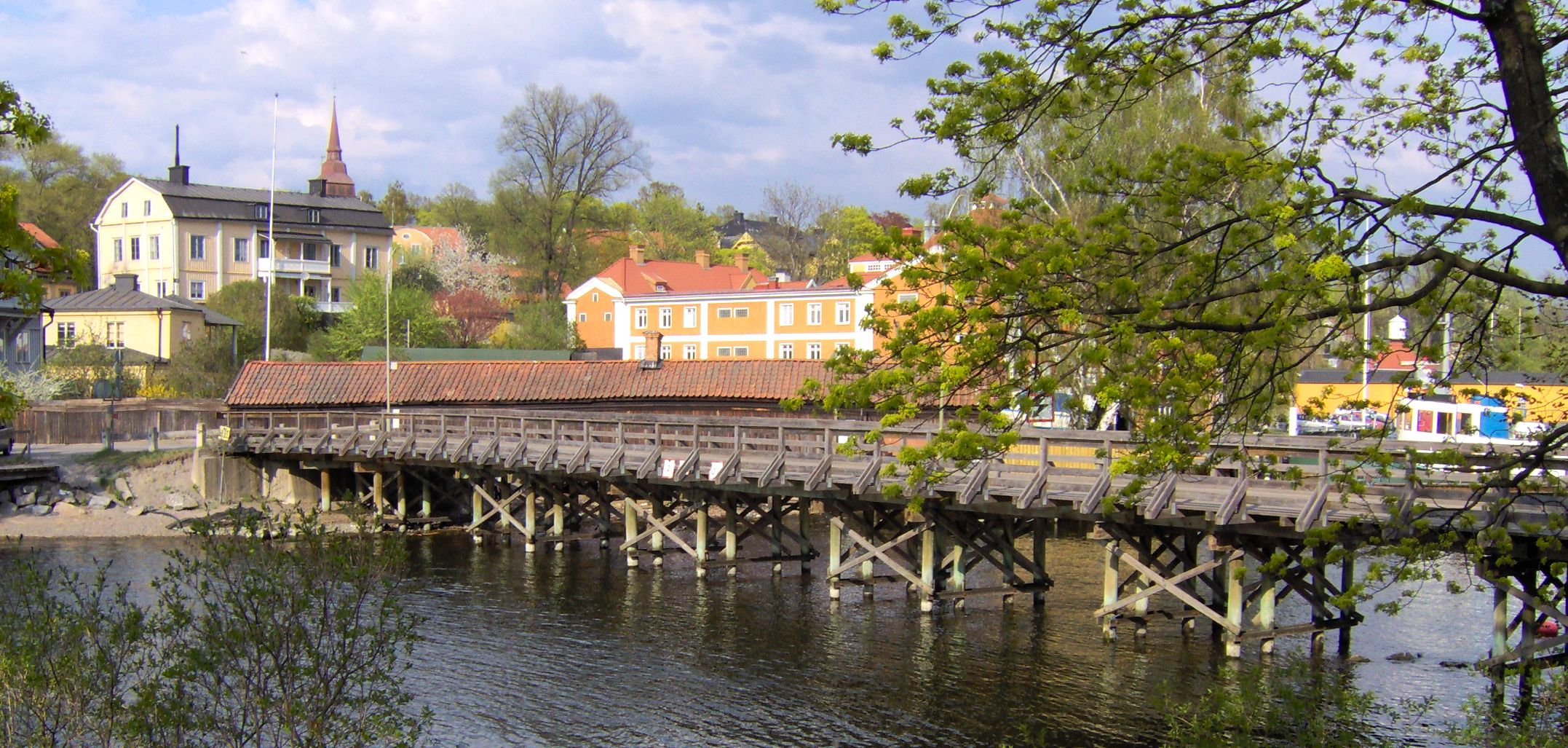
Beckholmsbron, the bridge leading over to Beckholmen, 2006.

== History ==
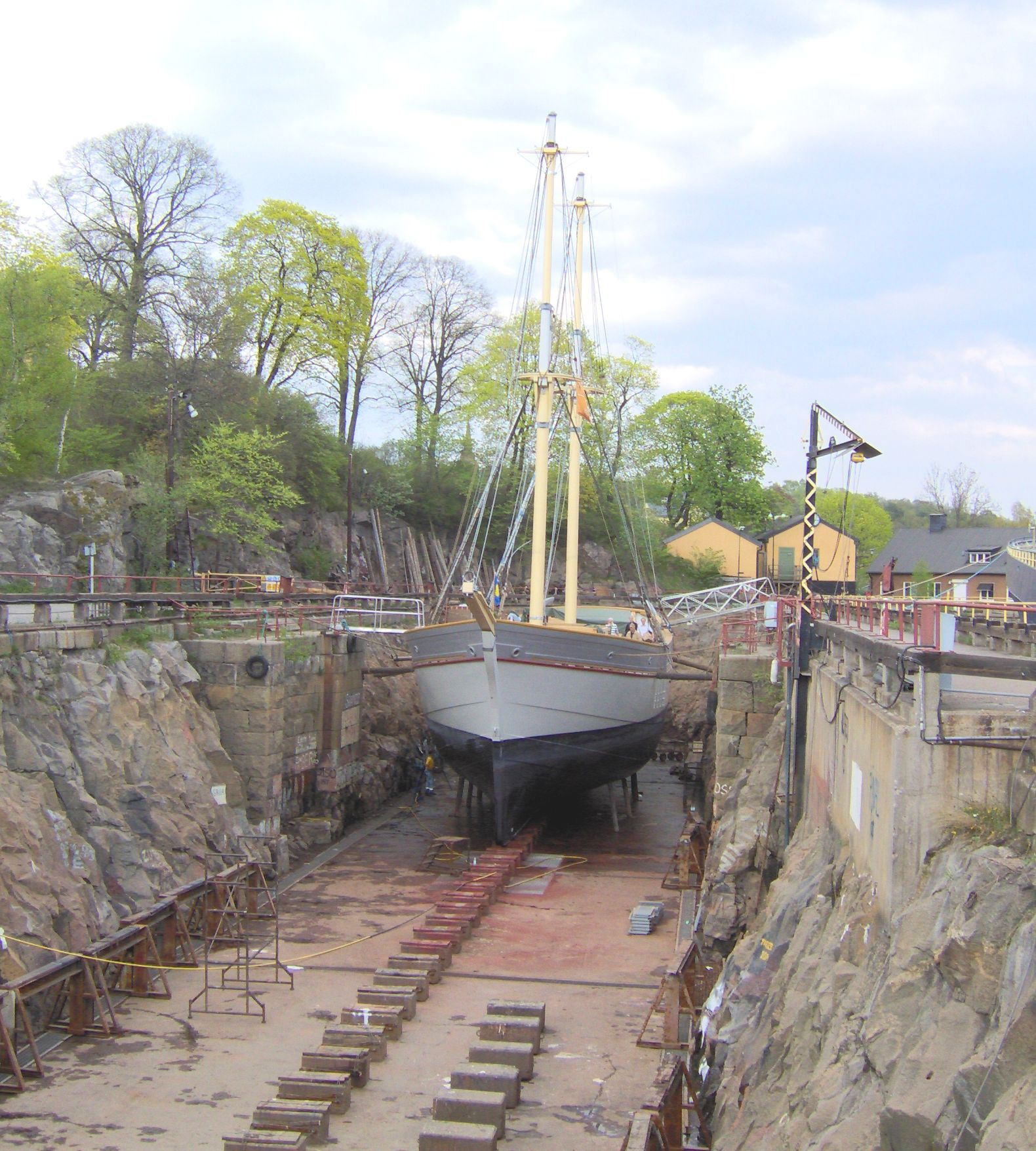
The brig Stockholm in one of the three dry docks on Beckholmen.

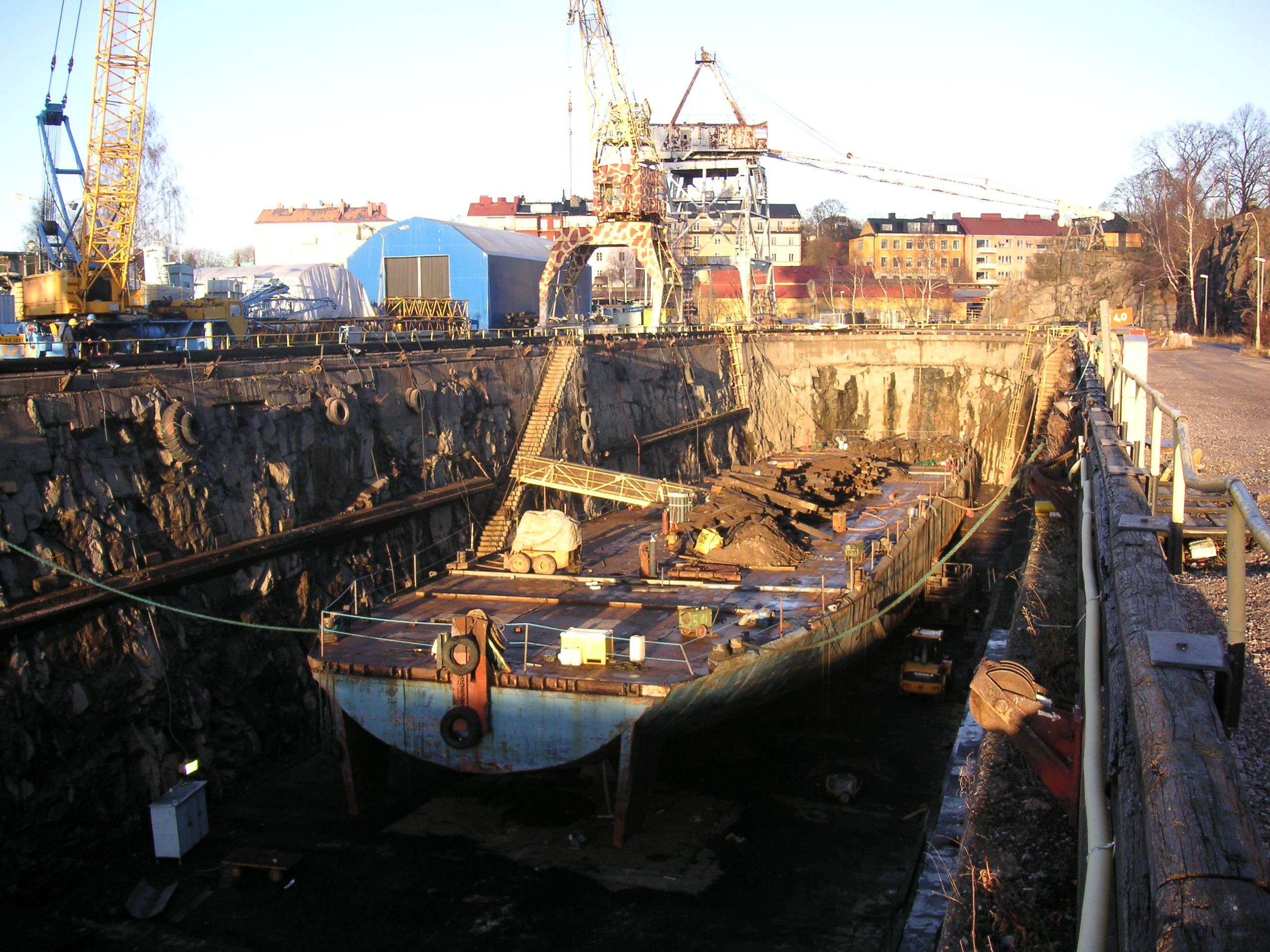
The GV-dock in 2007.

The original name of the island, Biskopsholmen ("Bishop's Islet") and other similar local names such as Biskopsudden ("Bishop's Point"), is associated with the priory in Klara (formerly located on the eastern part of Kungsholmen) to which the surrounding area was donated by King Magnus Ladulås (1240–1290), who in turn took it over from the archbishop and chapter in Uppsala in 1286.

Set up in 1633, a private pitch boilery started to produce pitch (by boiling tar) on the island, pitch at the time being both frequently used at the city's abundant shipyards and an important national trade item. The operations must have had quite an impact, since Queen Christina (1626–1689) when handing the area over to the city in 1647, explains she wished to see storehouses built on Bäck- eller Tiärholmen (The "Pitch" or "Tar Islet") for "the advantage and benefit of the city and the residents". Thus having both its name and reputation set, the islet was bestowed a tar distilling workshop, originally intended for the north-eastern shores of Södermalm, replacing the boilery during the 1680s. Private entrepreneurs took charge of the island in 1717 and, in spite of a devastating fire in 1723, developed it into an important part of their trading house.

As Sweden lost its last war in 1809 it also lost Finland, the major source of raw material for the capital's tar industry, and during the first half of the 19th century the workshops on the island were passed back and forth between different owners. In 1848 however, the growing number of steamships produced a need for new shipyards, and for the purpose Beckholmen was bought by the city's wholesalers and shipping industry. The first two dry docks, 75 metres (246 feet) and 45 metres (148 feet) long respectively and provided with a steam-driven pumping-station, were thus burst out of the islands bedrock the following year, while the first bridge connecting the island to Djurgården, Beckholmsbron, was built. The docks were extended in two stages during the 1870s and 1890s to their present lengths, 102 metres (335 feet) and 99 metres (325 feet).

The island was bought by the city in 1918 and subsequently handed over to the Swedish Navy administration who had the third dock built 1923–1925. It was inaugurated by King Gustav V, and thus named "The GV-dock", and extended to 197 metres (646 feet) twenty years later. Two local landmarks, well known to most Stockholmers, cranes decorated as giraffes, were relocated to Beckholmen in 1988 from their original location at Södra Hammarbyhamnen.

== Present status ==
As of 2007, The Royal Djurgården Administration (Kungliga Djurgårdens Förvaltning, KDF) have taken over the management of the island, now included into the National City Park and protected as a historical monument. The large GV-dock is still in commercial use, run by the private entrepreneur GV Varv AB, while the two older docks are operated by a foundation and a society devoted to historical maritime sites and sailing ships, Stiftelsen Skärgårdsbåten and Sveriges Segelfartygsförening. To financially safeguard the continuity of the operations on Beckholmen and the maintenance of quays and parks, the city is expected to set up an agreement of investments with the administration, while the State will be required to finance some of the historical monuments on the island, including the docks. An environmental analysis in 1998-2005 have shown centuries of shipping activities on the island have produced high amounts of excreted lead, mercury, arsenic, and PAHs both on the island itself and on the sea bed surrounding it, and it has been estimated the island alone is responsible for some 10 per cent of the discharge in the outer Stockholm Harbour. The National Property Board together with the Djurgården administration therefore have applied for additional funds from the Stockholm County Administrative Board (Länsstyrelsen i Stockholms län) for necessary sanitation operations.

Though most of the shipping trade since long have abandoned the harbour of Stockholm, and icebreakers, until recently stationed in the city harbour, are driven out because they are said to intimidate tourists, Beckholmen remains a living maritime environment, carefully preserving its heritage and throughout the year minding ships of all sizes, ages, and materials.

== See also ==
- Geography of Stockholm
- Kastellholmen
- Skeppsholmen
