= Royal Right of Disposal (Sweden) =

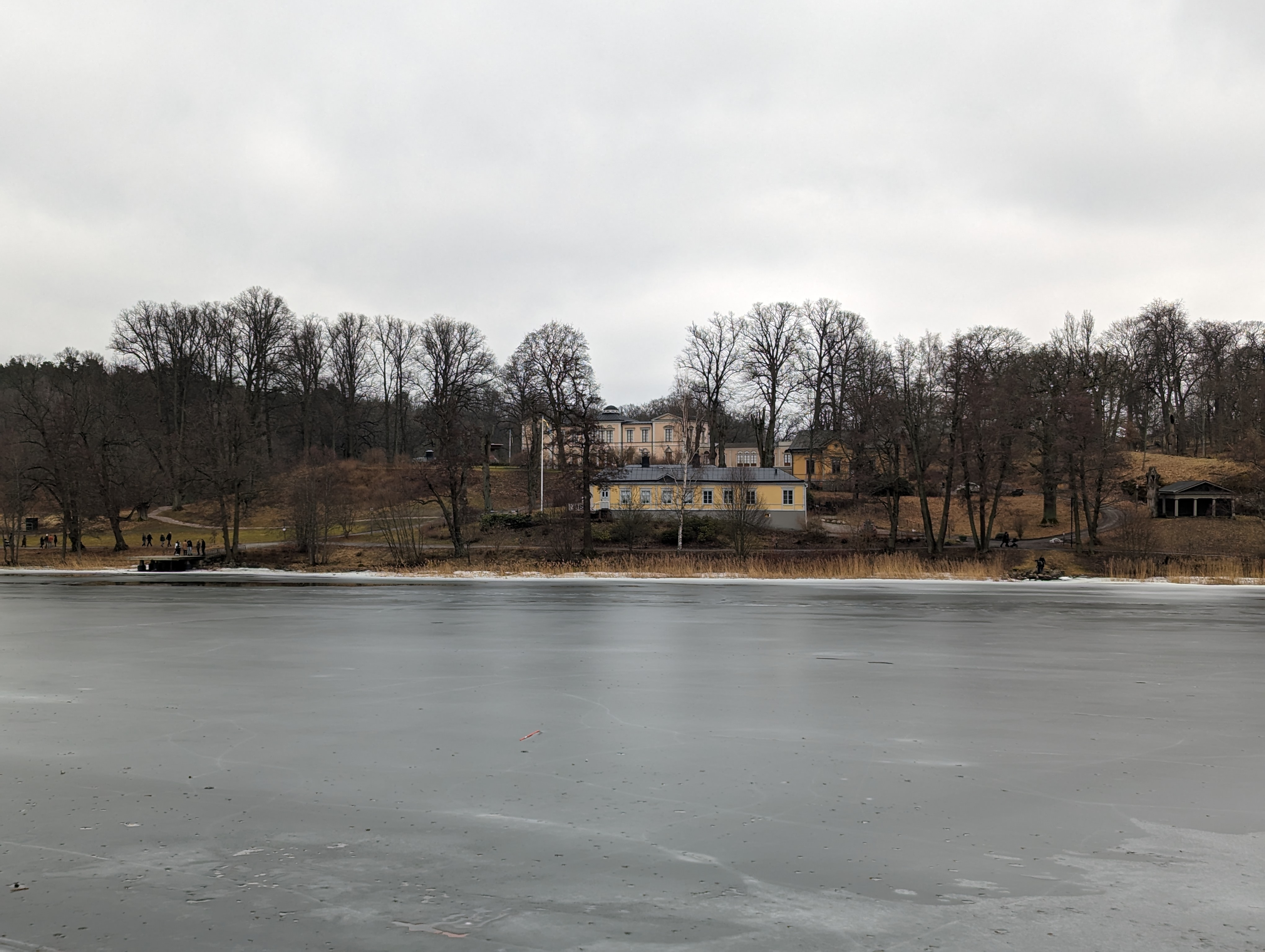
Part of the north coast of Djurgården Island with Rosendal Palace visible

The Royal Right of Disposal (Sweden) is an agreement between the Riksdag of Sweden and its monarch that places at the disposal of the latter the Swedish Crown palaces and the large Stockholm island of Djurgården. This right of disposal (dispositionsrätt), still in effect, was enacted during the period when the Swedish Constitution of 1809 was worked out, during which the king lost income and other powers.

Properties thus placed at the disposal of the monarch are owned by the State, administered by the Office of the Steward (Ståthållarämbetet) of the Royal Court of Sweden, and managed by the National Property Board of Sweden, with the exception of Djurgården with Rosendal Palace, which is under special royal management (Kungliga Djurgårdens Förvaltning). It has been claimed that, through the Royal Right of Disposal, this part of the predemocratic monarchical system remains intact, despite the intention under the 1974 Instrument of Government that the Swedish monarchy lose all political powers.
