= General Art and Industrial Exposition of Stockholm =

World's Fair event

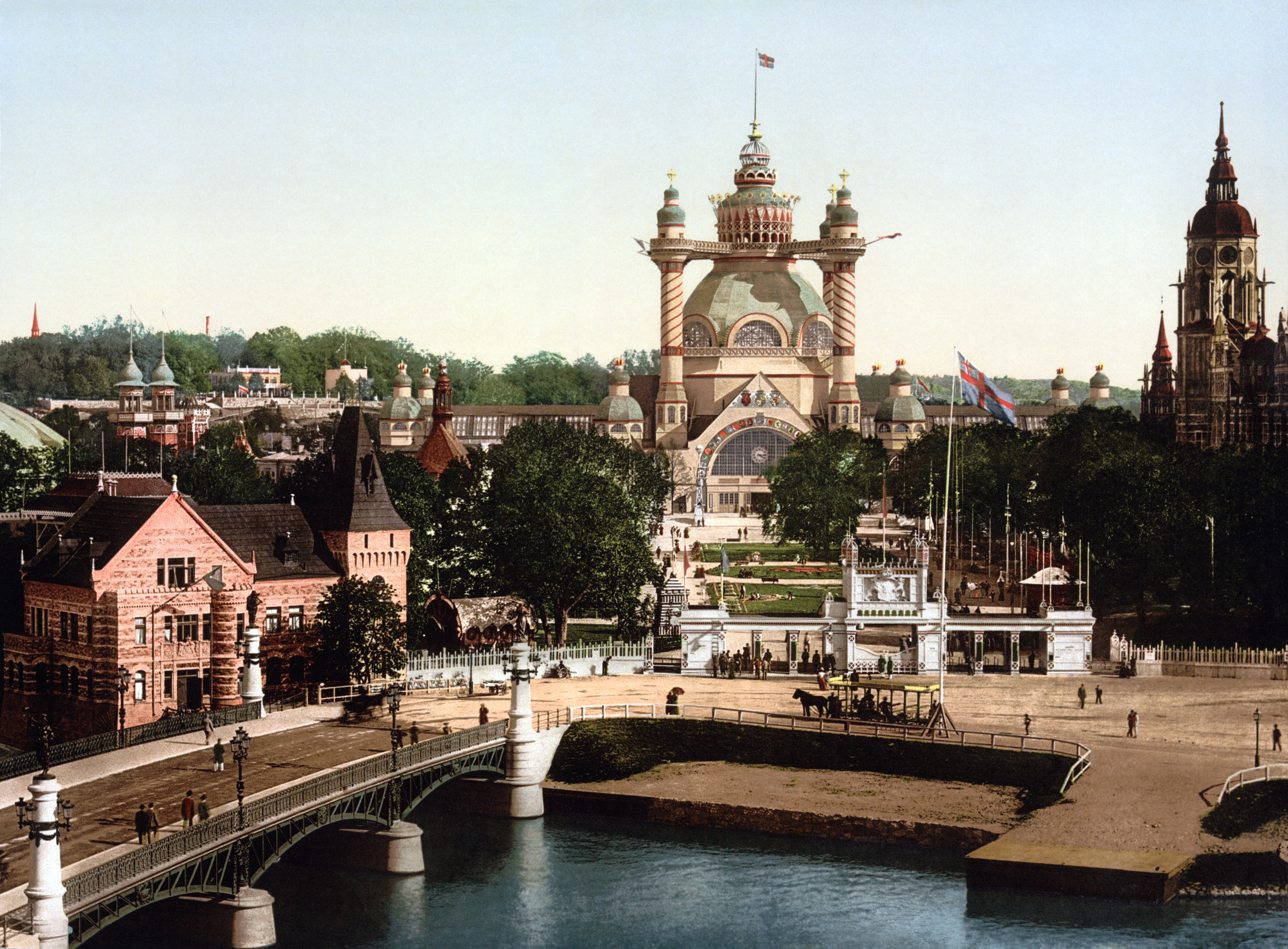
- Photochrom print of the 1897 exhibition, digitally restored

Overview
- BIE-class: Unrecognized exposition
- Name: General Art and Industrial Exposition of Stockholm

Participant(s)
- Countries: 5

Location
- Country: Sweden
- City: Stockholm
- Venue: Djurgården
- Coordinates: 59°19′38″N 18°05′52″E

Timeline
- Opening: May 15, 1897

The General Art and Industrial Exposition of Stockholm of 1897 (Swedish: Allmänna konst- och industriutställningen) also known as Stockholm Exhibition or Stockholm World's Fair (Stockholmsutställningen) was a World's Fair staged in 1897 in Stockholm, Sweden.

== Background ==
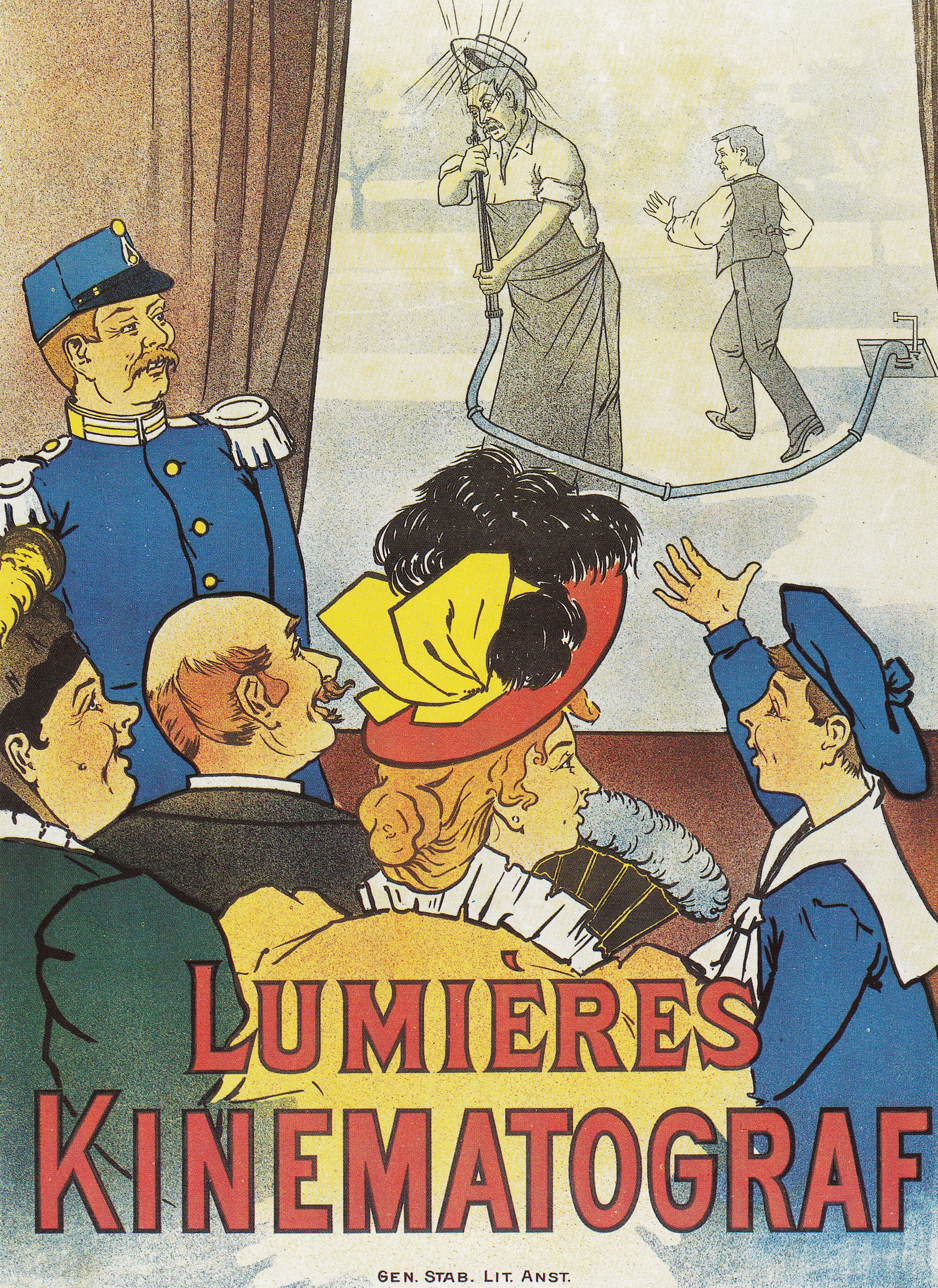
Sweden's first film poster, for Lumière's Kinomatograf at the Stockholm Exhibition in 1897

On December 16, 1893, leading societies in Sweden approached the King with a petition expressing their wish to host an exposition. With royal approval, a commission was appointed and the Government gave formal approval for an exposition of art and industry to be held in 1897. This marked the 25th anniversary of King Oscar's reign. Construction began in 1895 and the Exposition was finally opened on May 15, 1897, by King Oscar II. The 3,722 exhibitors were limited to those from Sweden, Finland, Norway, Denmark, and Russia; even though Canada and Germany tried several times to be allowed to participate.

The exhibition site was located on the island of Djurgården, and many of the structures on the western part of the island originated as part of the exhibition. These include Djurgårdsbron, the main bridge to the island, the Skansens Bergbana, the funicular railway now in the Skansen open-air museum and zoo, and the Nordic Museum. One of the most prominent buildings of the exposition, a 16,820 m² exposition hall in wood, designed by the architect Ferdinand Boberg and featuring a 100 metres tall cupola and 4 minarets, was demolished after the exposition however, together with many other pavilions built in non-permanent materials.

One theme of the exposition was the new media technologies of the day, including film and the phonograph. The opening ceremonies of the exposition were documented in early recordings, including the opening address by King Oscar II. These recordings have been preserved, and are now available on the internet.

== Aftermath ==
After the exposition closed on October 3, 1897, the large industrial hall was torn down, but the Nordic Museum continued to be used and still remains in Stockholm. Remaining in their original places are the Reinhold Bakery, now a restaurant; the Royal Hunt Club Pavilion, now a private home; and the Diamond Rock Drill Co. Pavilion. Several pavilions were moved to Skansen including the Braghallen, the Fröstorp, and the Villa Lusthusporten.
