= Lilla Sjötullsbron =

Concrete pedestrian bridge in Stockholm, Sweden

Coordinates: 59°19′35.7″N 18°8′49.4″E

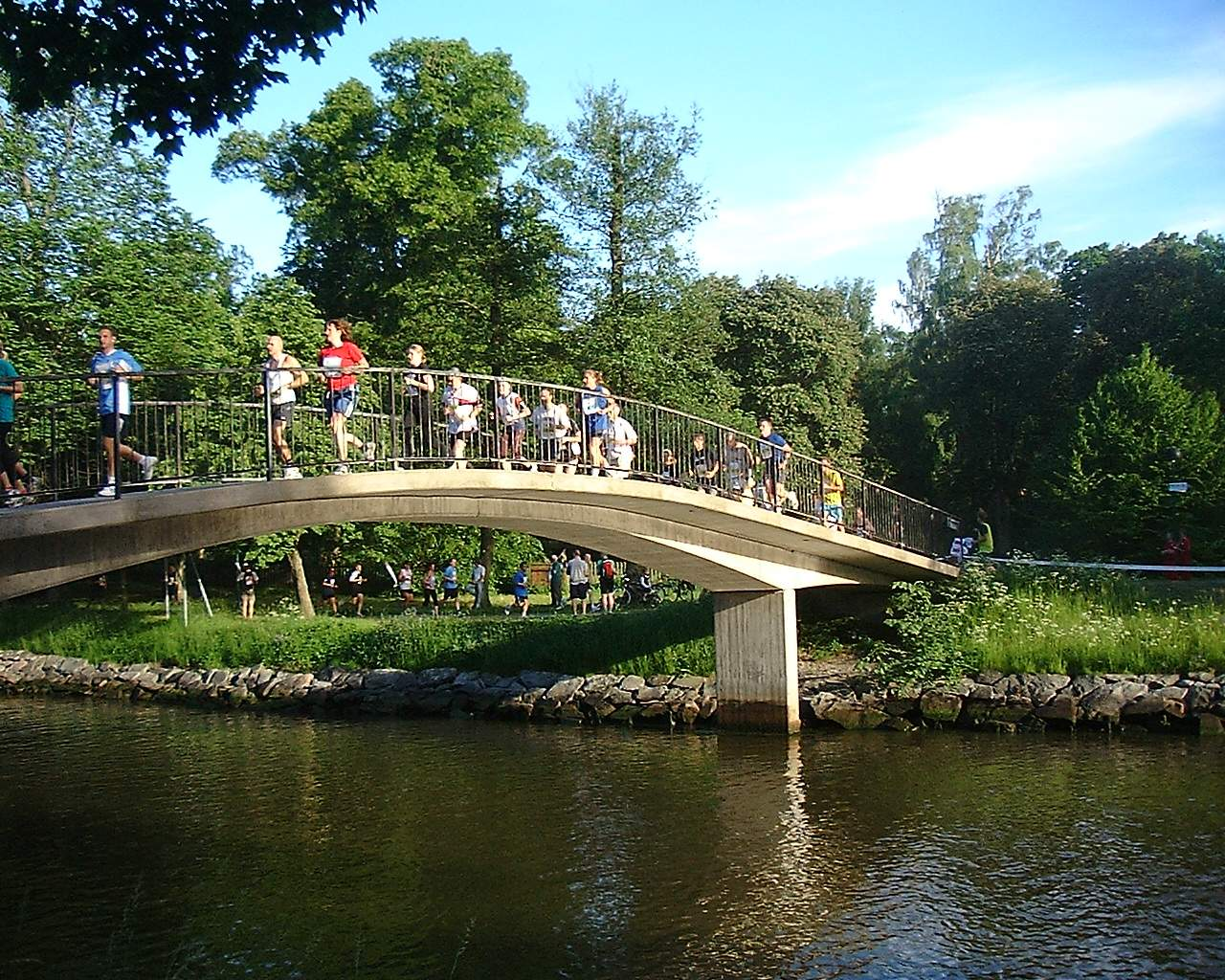
Lilla Sjötullsbron.

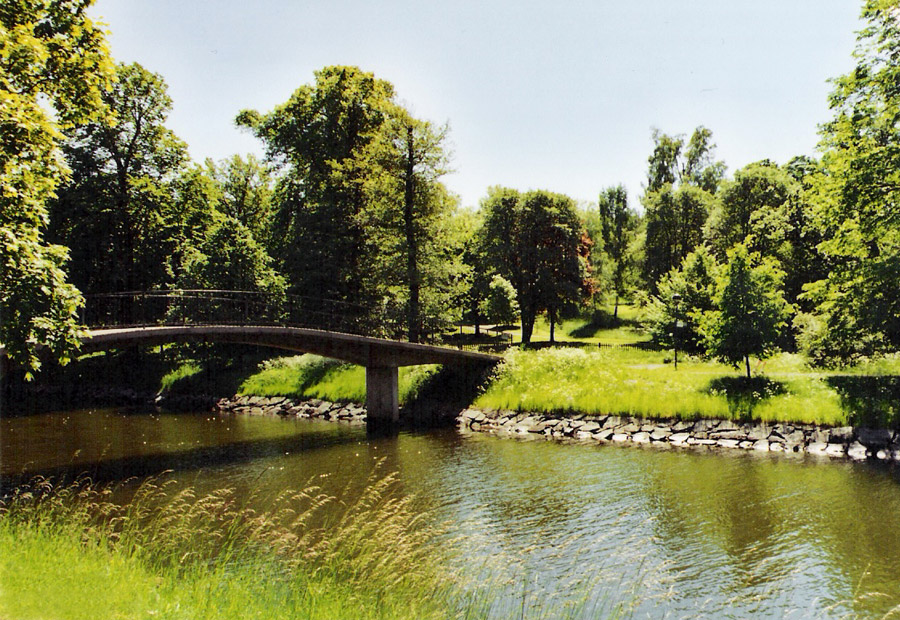
Lilla Sjötullsbron in 2005.

Lilla Sjötullsbron (Swedish: "Small Sea Customs Bridge") is a concrete pedestrian bridge in central Stockholm, Sweden. Passing over Djurgårdsbrunnskanalen it connects Djurgården island to the mainland north of it.

Completed in 1965, the bridge was named after the building of the canal guard, called Lilla sjötullen ("Small sea Customs"), built in the 1820s. The bridge is about 3.7 metres wide, 32 metres long of which some 20 metres passes over the canal. It offers a horizontal clearance of 3.1 metres.

== See also ==
- List of bridges in Stockholm
- Djurgårdsbron
- Djurgårdsbrunnsbron
- Djurgårdsbrunnsviken
