= Djurgårdsbron =

Coordinates: 59.331°N 18.094°E

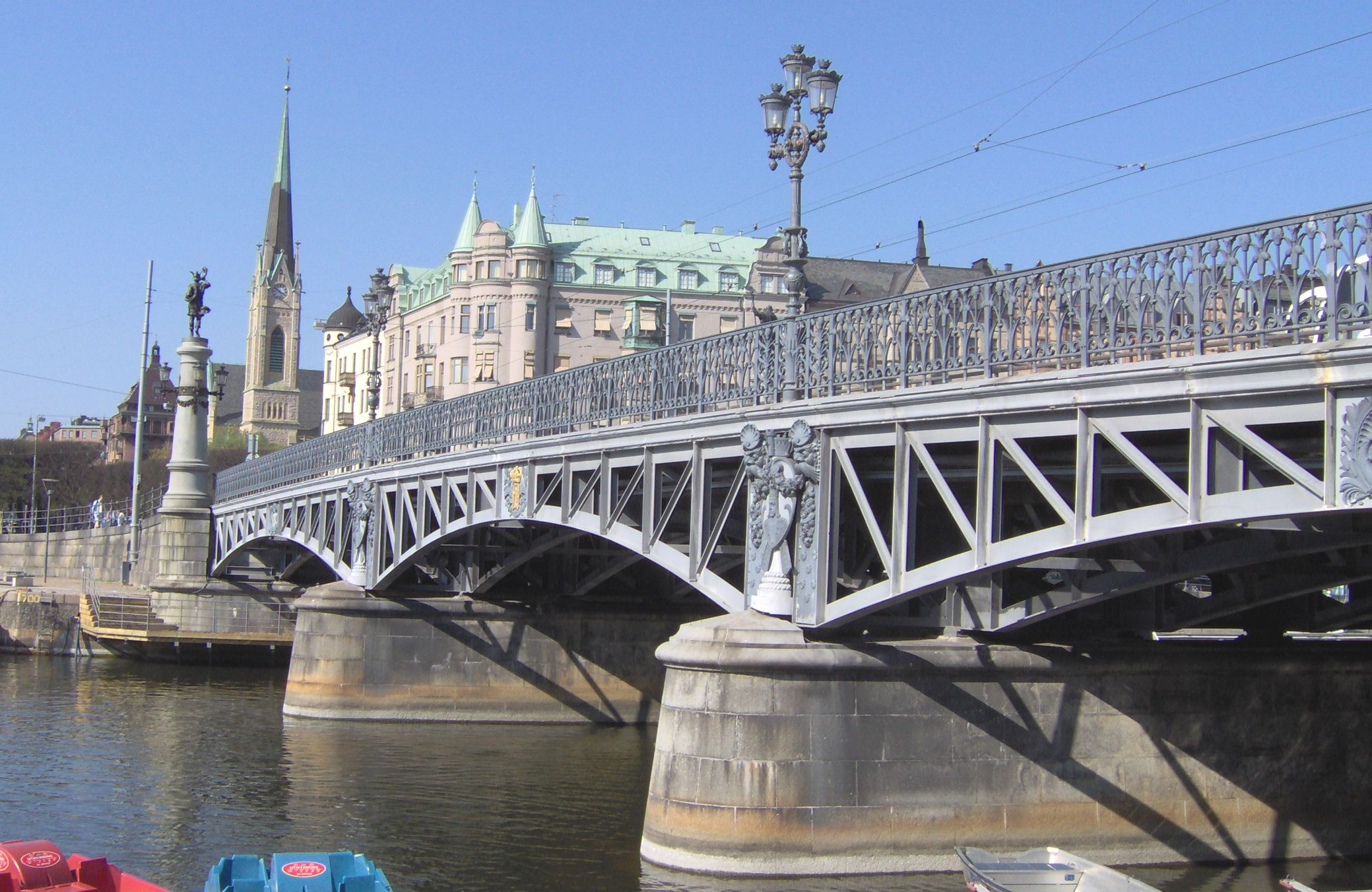
Western side of Djurgårdsbron in 2006, looking north.

Djurgårdsbron (Swedish: "The Djurgården Bridge") is a bridge in central Stockholm, Sweden. Designed by Carl Fraenell and built for the Stockholm World's Fair 1897, the present bridge forms a southern extension to the boulevard Narvavägen, thus connecting mainland Östermalm to the island Djurgården. It is one of four bridges stretching from Djurgården, the others being Djurgårdsbrunnsbron, Beckholmsbron, and Lilla Sjötullsbron.

Featured on the bridge standing on tall granite columns are four Old Norse gods, sculpted by Rold Adlersparre: Heimdall blowing in his Gjallarhorn; Odin's wife Frigg holding a rod; Freyja with a falcon (one of her guises) in her hand; and Thor with his hammer Mjolnir resting on his shoulder. Flanking the pathways are cast iron railings displaying stylized plants and the abutments and candelabras designed by the architect Erik Josephson (1864–1929).

== History ==
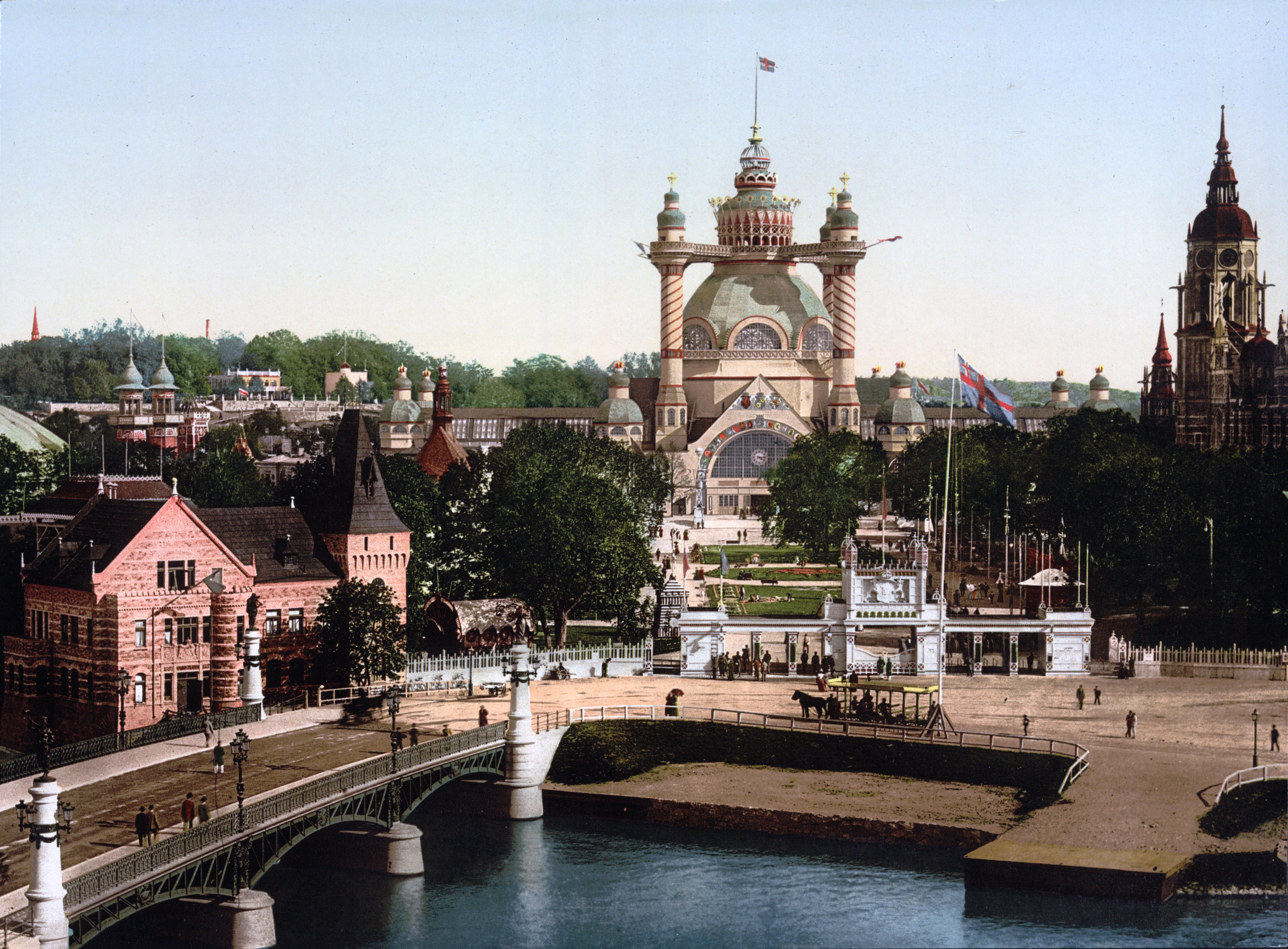
Present bridge when inaugurated in 1897.

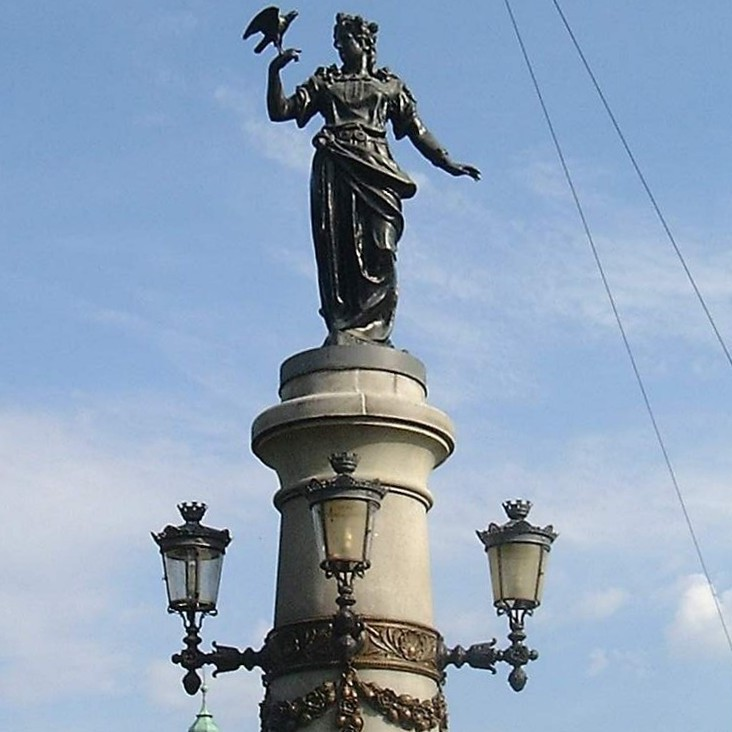
Statue of Freyja.

Preceded by a bridge much further east and thus simply referred to as "the new bridge", the original bridge at this location first appears on a map dated 1696. However, duties covering the costs for material and carpenters required for its construction are brought up in the Royal accounts as early as 1661.

Appearing together with the original bridge on a map dated 1733, a new bridge built in 1730 by King Frederick I (1676–1751) requiring a roadworthy passage to the Royal hunting grounds, was referred to as Fredrikshovsbron ("The Court of Frederick Bridge") due to its vicinity to the palace Fredrikshov. Concerned for the state of the bridge, the king six years later had the bridge leased out to the island's surveyor, who, made responsible for its maintenance, was authorized to take up bridge tolls fixed by the king. The bridge gave way, non the less, under the king's coach in 1745.

The bridge is mentioned again in 1801, then referred to as Djurgårdsflottbro ("The Djurgården Pontoon Bridge"), said to allow the passing of ships, and having a ramp crossing a marshy terrain and therefore partly resting on logs. This bridge, in 1820 described as decayed, rotten, and grass-grown, was replaced by another wooden bridge in 1825 on the order of King Charles XIV John (1763–1844). A stone bridge discussed at this time was never carried out, and by 1849 the new bridge was in such a state it had to be replaced by a three-span iron bridge resting on wooden poles. To ensure the loading ratio before its inauguration, 200 men from the guard regiment nearby were order to march back and forth across the bridge in different formations, an odd practice considering the insignificant number of people being able to swim at the time.

Reinforced in 1886, the iron bridge was demolished in 1895 to be replaced by the current three-span steel bridge, 18 metres wide, about 58 metres long, and able to carry the new trams. The provisional bridge used during the construction was pulled down following the World's Fair in 1897. Because of post-WW2 traffic loads, the bridge had to be reconstructed in 1977, a job done in three months - the three spans wielded on the quay and lifted in place using a pontoon crane.

== See also ==
- List of bridges in Stockholm
