= Djurgårdsbrunnsbron =

Bridge in central Stockholm, Sweden

Coordinates: 59°19′46″N 18°07′55″E

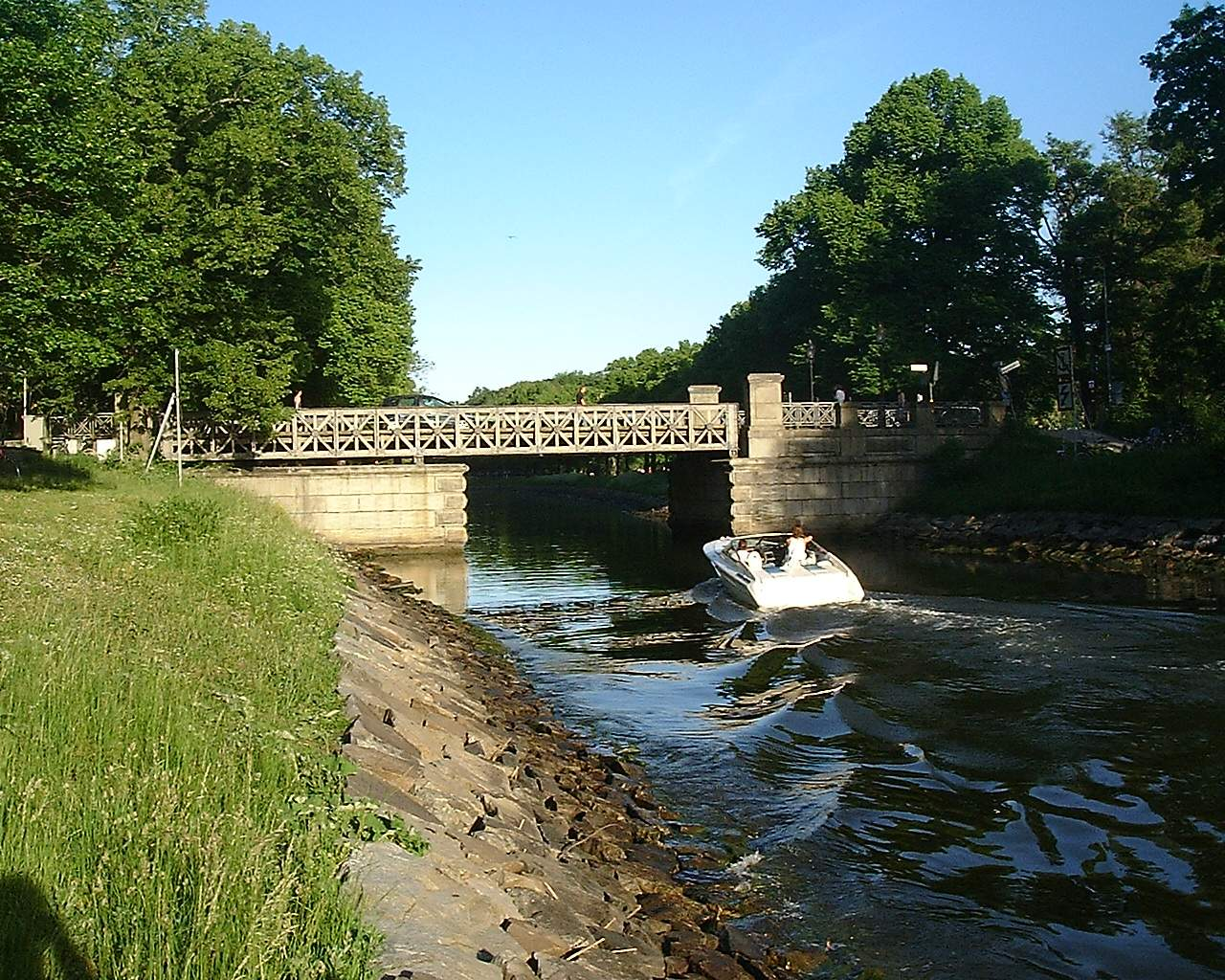
Djurgårdsbrunnsbron.

Djurgårdsbrunnsbron (Swedish: "The Djurgården Well Bridge") is a bridge in central Stockholm, Sweden, connecting northern and southern Djurgården. It is the city's only remaining swing bridge, the default bridge type in Stockholm during the 19th century. It has been closed since 1966.

The bridge, 6,5 metres wide, is made of two 20,8 metres long girders forming the railings between which the roadway is passing. When open, it allowed a passage 10 metres wide.

Due to land elevation and silt, the original waterway extending the canal Djurgårdsbrunnskanalen to Saltsjön had to be reconstructed 1832–34, and a wooden bridge crossing the canal was added. In order to allow smaller ships to pass, the canal was widened and deepened 1883–85, and the bridge replaced by the present steel swing bridge inaugurated in 1884.

The name Djurgårdsbrunn is referring to a mineral spring discovered in 1690 but abandoned in the mid 18th century for another mineral spring believed to have once served as an offer spring. An establishment built here saw its heyday in the 1820s and 1830s, and a restaurant is still found next to the now permanently shut bridge.

== See also ==
- List of bridges in Stockholm
- Djurgårdsbron
- Beckholmsbron
- Lilla Sjötullsbron
- Royal National City Park
