= Djurgården =

Island and urban district in Stockholm, Sweden

Coordinates: 59°19′30″N 18°07′00″E

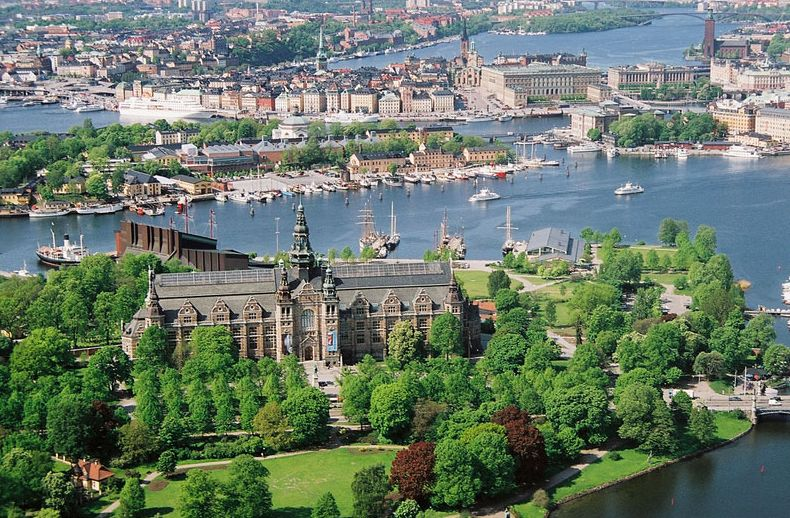
- The Nordic Museum at Djurgården, facing south-west with Skeppsholmen, Gamla stan and Södermalm in the background
- Interactive map of Djurgården
- Location: Djurgården, Stockholm, Sweden

Djurgården (pronounced [ˈjʉ̌ː(r)ɡɔɳ] or [ˈjʉ̂ːrˌɡoːɖɛn]) or, more officially, Kungliga Djurgården (Swedish for 'The [Royal] Animal Park'), is an island in central Stockholm, Sweden. Djurgården is home to historical buildings and monuments, museums, galleries, the amusement park Gröna Lund, the open-air museum Skansen, the small residential area Djurgårdsstaden, yacht harbours, and extensive stretches of forest and meadows. It is one of the Stockholmers' favorite recreation areas and tourist destinations alike, attracting over ten million visitors per year, of which some five million come to visit the museums and amusement park. The island belongs to the National City park founded in 1995. Since the 15th century the Swedish monarch has owned or held the right of disposition of Royal Djurgården. Today, this right is exercised by the Royal Djurgården Administration which is a part of the Royal Court of Sweden.

A larger area of the city, separated from Djurgården proper by Djurgårdsbrunnsviken is Norra Djurgården (Northern Djurgården), including Gärdet.

== History ==
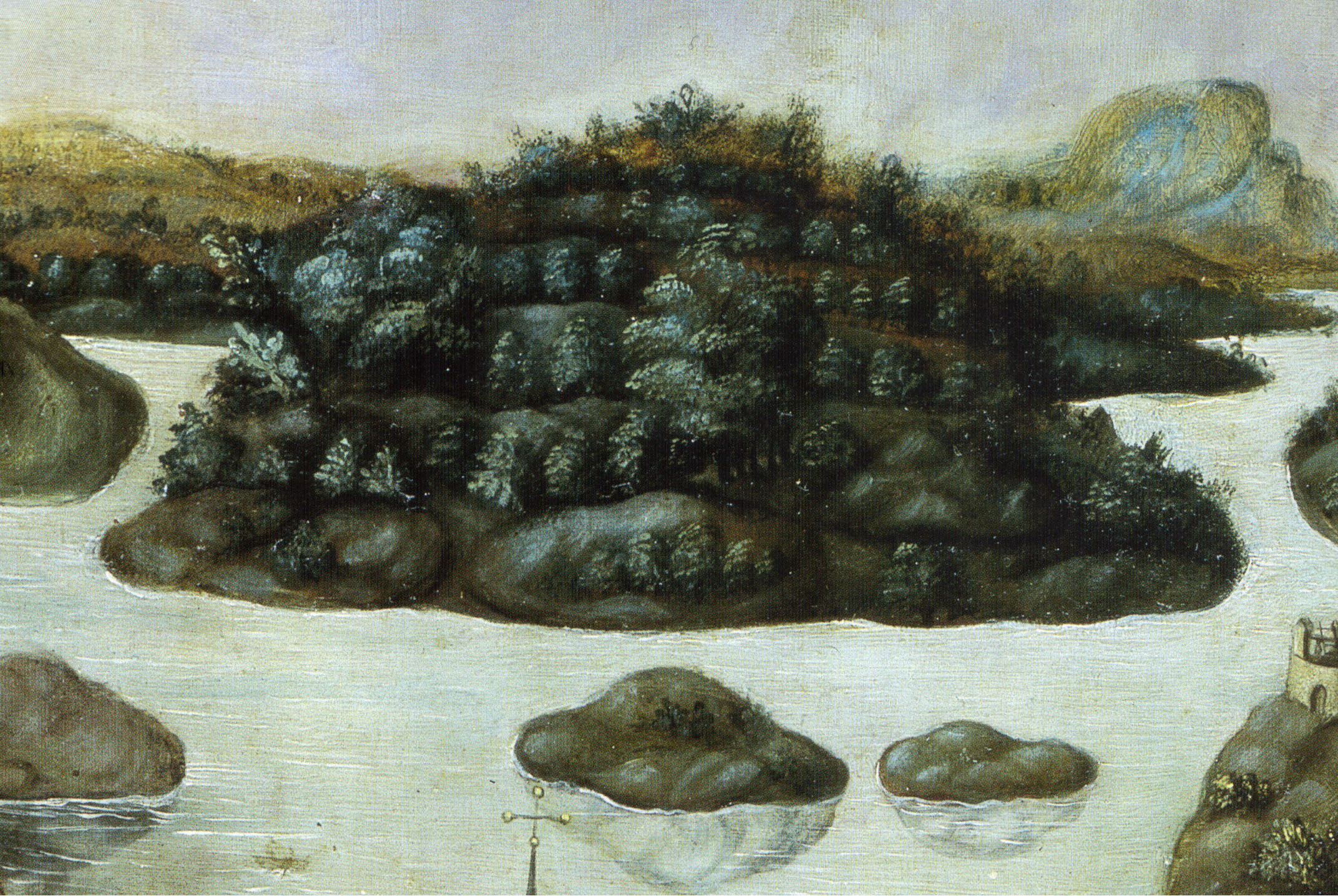
Detail from Vädersolstavlan showing Djurgården in 1535.

Djurgården was until the 16th century known as Valmundsö (Note: Spelling varied, it has been spelled Walmunzø (1286), Walmundzø (1288), Walmanzö (1349), Wadhmundzøø (1432), Wadhmalsø (1437), Wadmalsö (1444), Walmundzön (1452), Walmasöön (1511), Walmarsöö (1516), Wallmarsön, Waldemarksön (17th century).) and this name is still preserved in locations such as Waldemarsudde. Though several proposals to explain this name have been put forward, no authoritative explanation is generally accepted. While the name of King Valdemar (1239–1302) was probably associated with the old name during the 17th century, the separate elements of the original variations of the name might be interpreted as etymologically related to either Walm-und-ö – if walm is linked to the Anglo-Saxon words wielm, wylm, this would mean the original name should be interpreted as "The island outside of which the waves grow large" (an interpretation with no equivalents in other Nordic geographic names) – or Wal-mund-ö – which could possibly be interpreted as walder ("embankment", "grounds") and mun ("mouth"), i.e. "the grounds next to the mouth of Lake Mälaren".

The present name, Djurgården, stems from the game park of King John III, which he declared the intention to realize in February 1579 to keep deer, reindeer, and elk. In the 17th century a baiting arena was built at the location.

In 1667, a few cottages intended for "paralysed and crippled seafarers" were built forming what was to become Djurgårdsstaden. The Swedish Navy moved to Karlskrona during the 1680s however, and the neighbourhood was instead populated by a diverse crowd. Plans to demolish the "insignificant shacks" in front of the World Fair in 1897, and for a planned expansion of the naval shipyard in 1918, never were accomplished and the area is today protected as a historical monument.

During the late 18th century, Djurgården transformed into more of a popular recreational area than a Royal game park; in 1801, the theatre Djurgårdsteatern was opened, which was to be one of the most popular establishments there during the 19th century. King Charles XIV John's creation of the Rosendal Palace in the 1820s marked the beginning of Djurgården's development as a stately residential area, paired with the creation of several entertainment establishments in the late 19th century, including Gröna Lund 1883, and Skansen 1891. At a café just south of Skansen, in block Alberget, sports club Djurgårdens IF was founded on 12 March 1891.

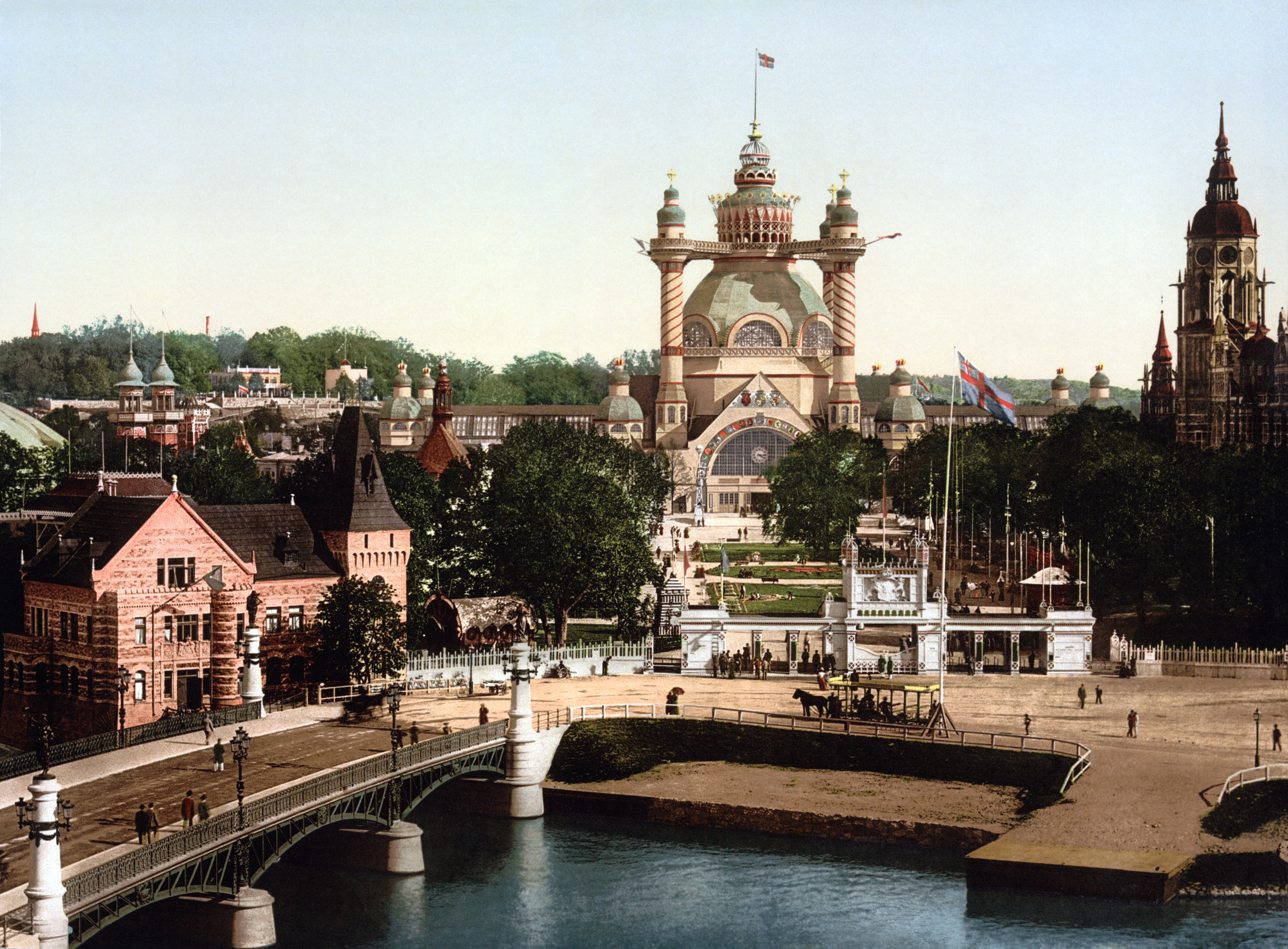
Photochrom print of the 1897 exhibition, digitally restored.

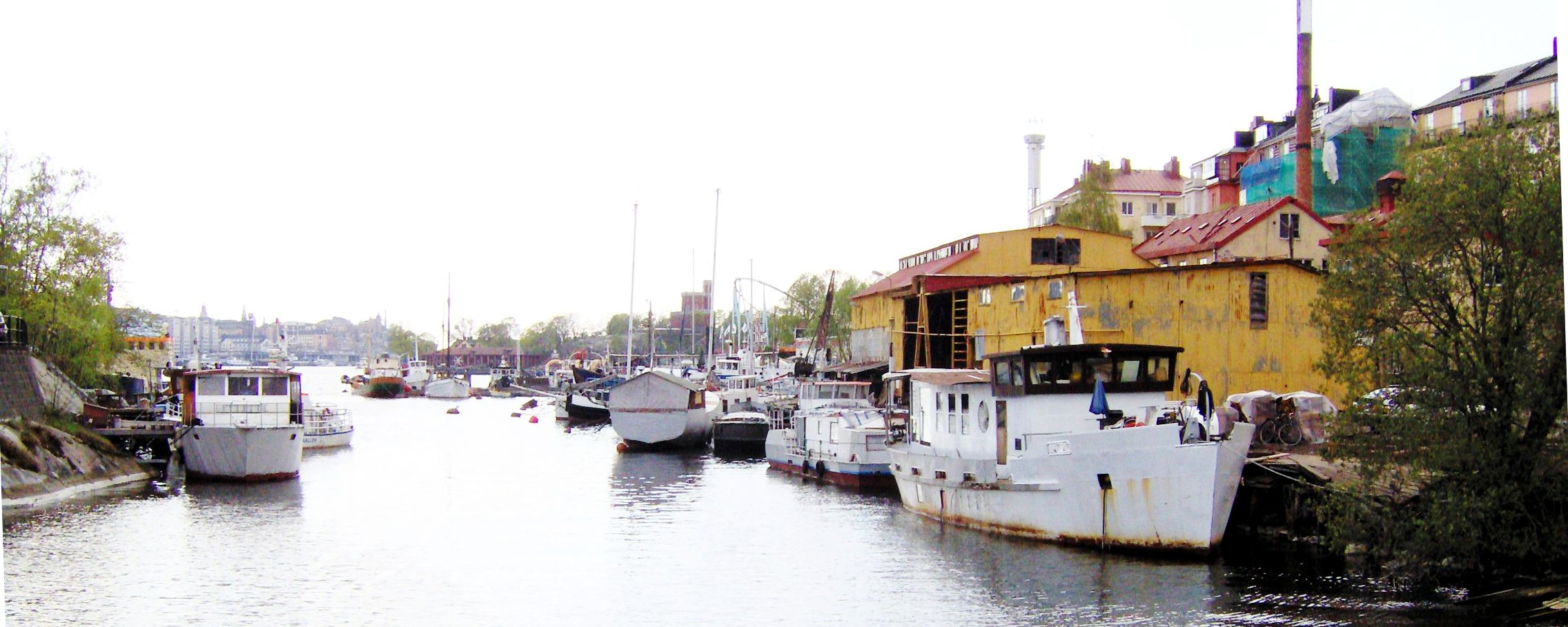
The shipyard on Djurgården's southern shore today.

The western waterfront of the island was a small scale shipyard during the late 17th and early 18th centuries, after which the Navy erected some 30 sheds for the winter quarters of galleys in the area. The operations expanded during the 1870s when a dry dock was constructed. Plans to relocate the shipyard in the beginning of the 20th century were interrupted by World War II, which meant the activities grew considerably instead, culminating in 1945 when 1,280 people were employed. In 1969, the Navy moved to Muskö, and in the early 1970s the area was transformed into the recreation area it is today.

Many structures on the western part of Djurgården date back to the Stockholm World's Fair of 1897, including Djurgårdsbron, the main bridge to the island. One of the most prominent buildings of the exposition, a 16,820 m^{2} (181,000 sq ft) exposition hall in wood, design by the architect Ferdinand Boberg and featuring a 100-metre (330 ft) tall cupola and 4 minarets, was demolished after the exposition however, together with many other pavilions built in non-permanent materials.

In what is today the southern part of the amusement park Gröna Lund and east of it, a private shipyard was developed from 1735 by the merchant Efraim Lothsack, who also had several new residential buildings built. The activities grew during the 19th century under the managership of John Burgman and Adolf Fredholm, of which the former had the church, Djurgårdskyrkan, and the school, Djurgårdsskolan, built. The shipyard was sold to the city in 1863 and moved to Södra Hammarbyhamnen in 1979. Another shipyard for pinnaces, built in the strait between Djurgården and Beckholmen in 1868, is still in operation.

The southern portion of the area hosted the Stockholm International Exhibition (1930).

== Sights and monuments ==
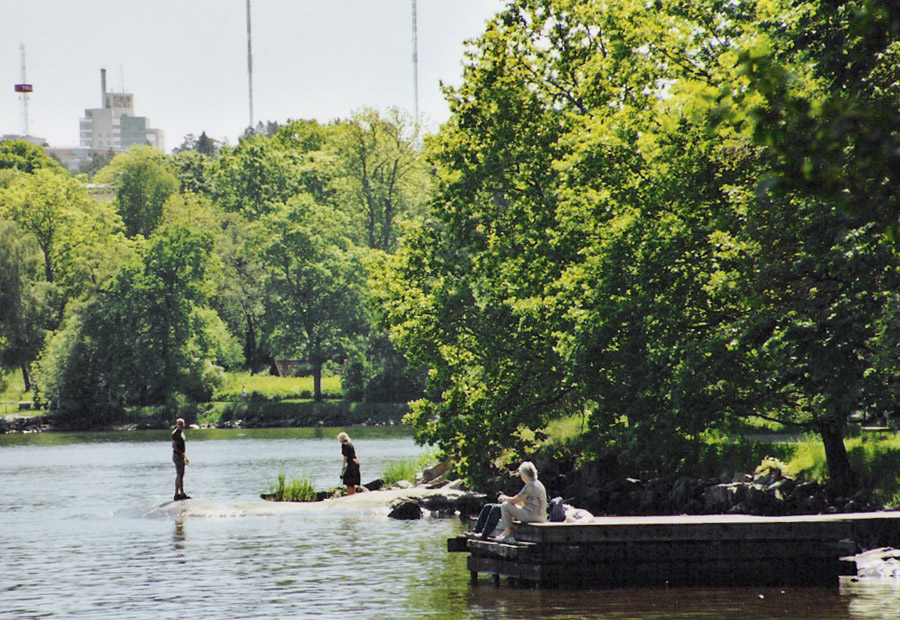
Waterfront promenade

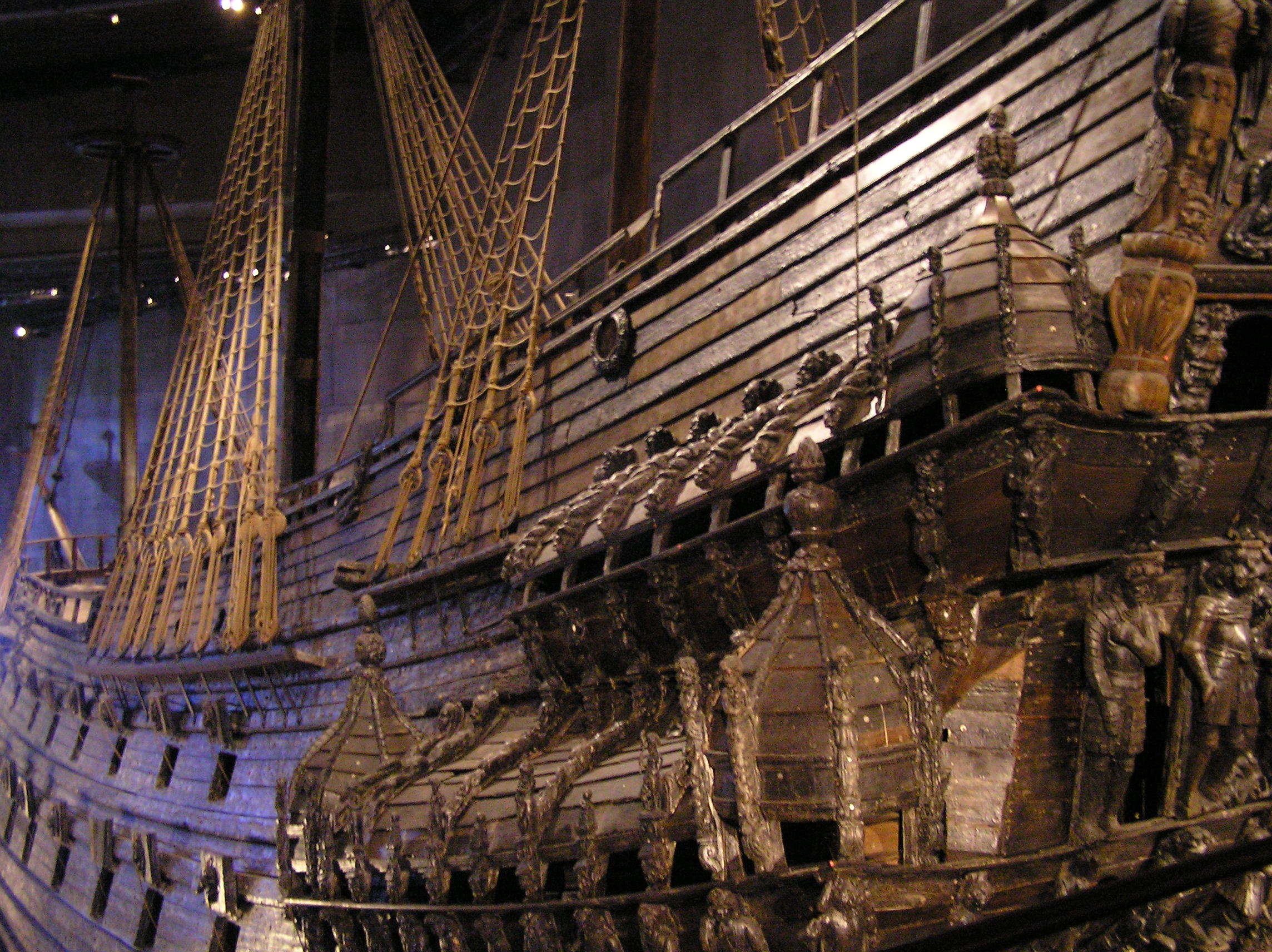
Interior of the Vasa Museum

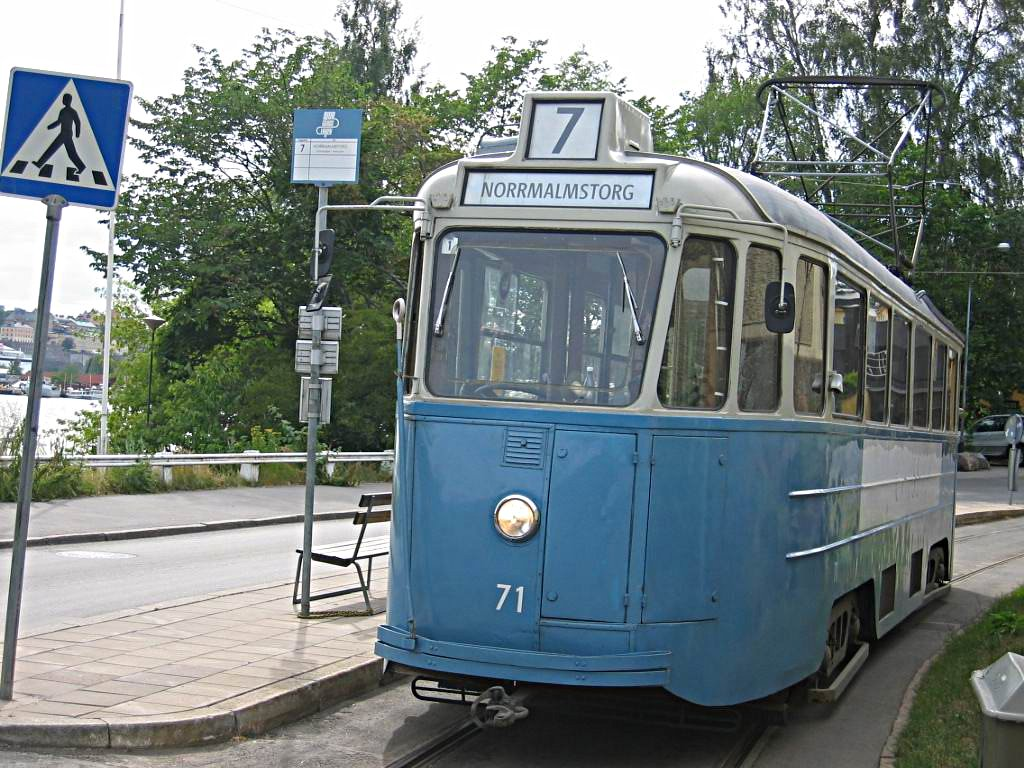
A veteran A25 "Mustang" tram on the Djurgården line

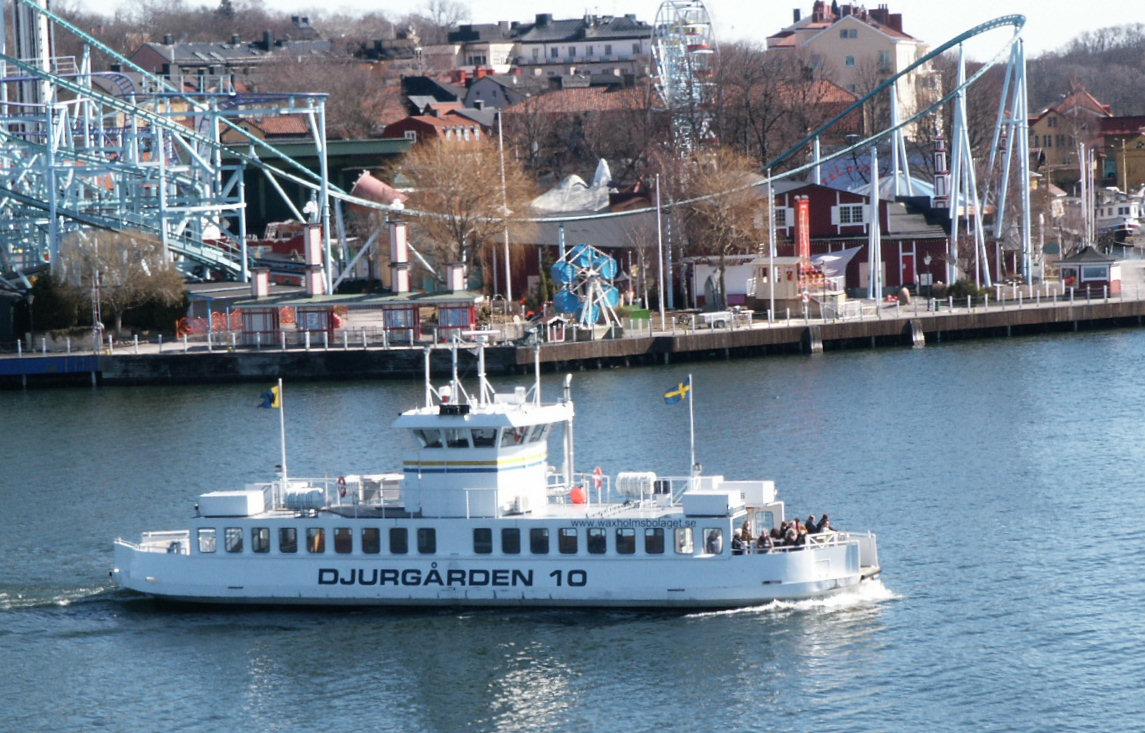
The Gröna lund amusement park and one of the ferries

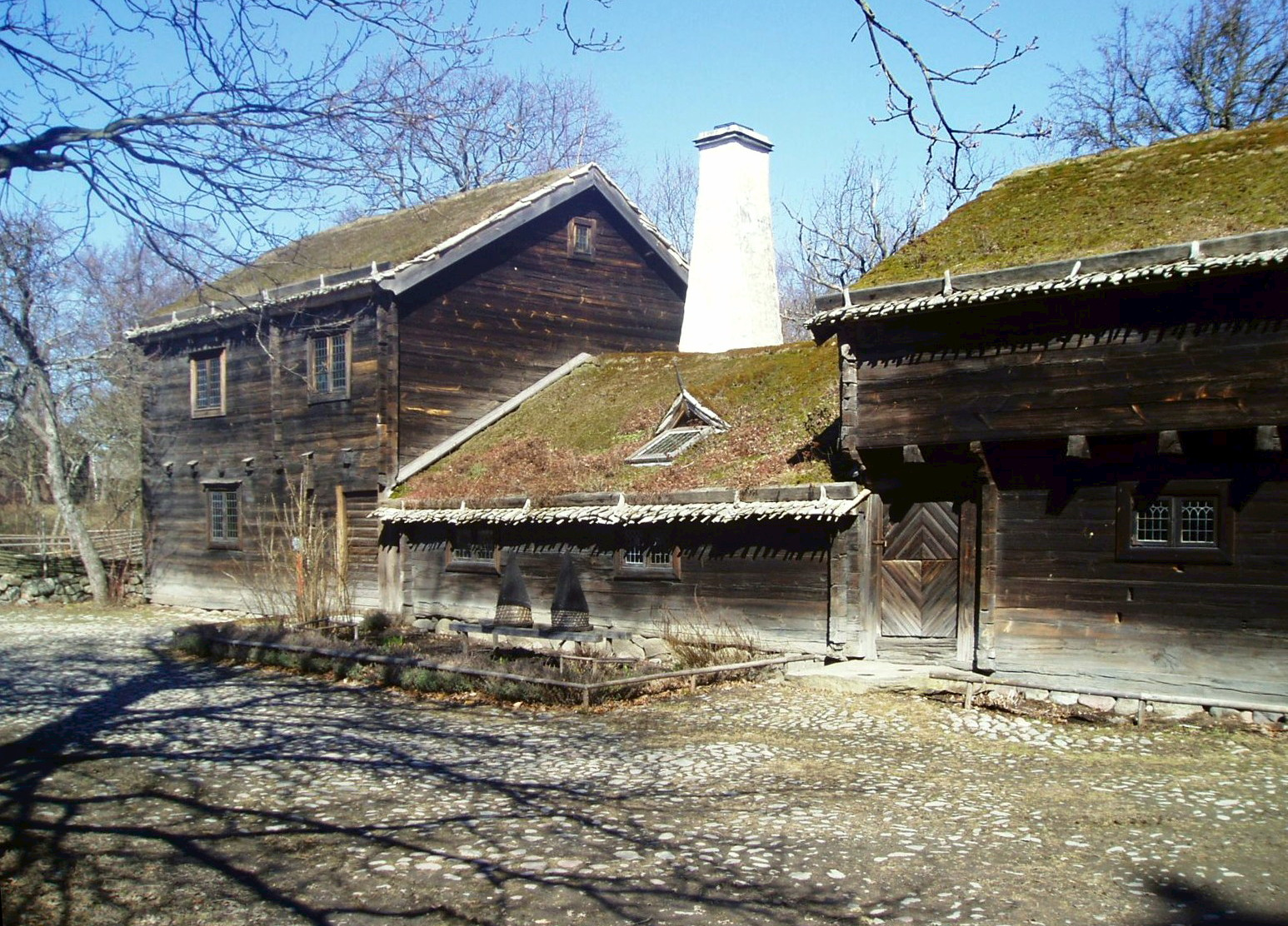
Traditional architecture at Skansen

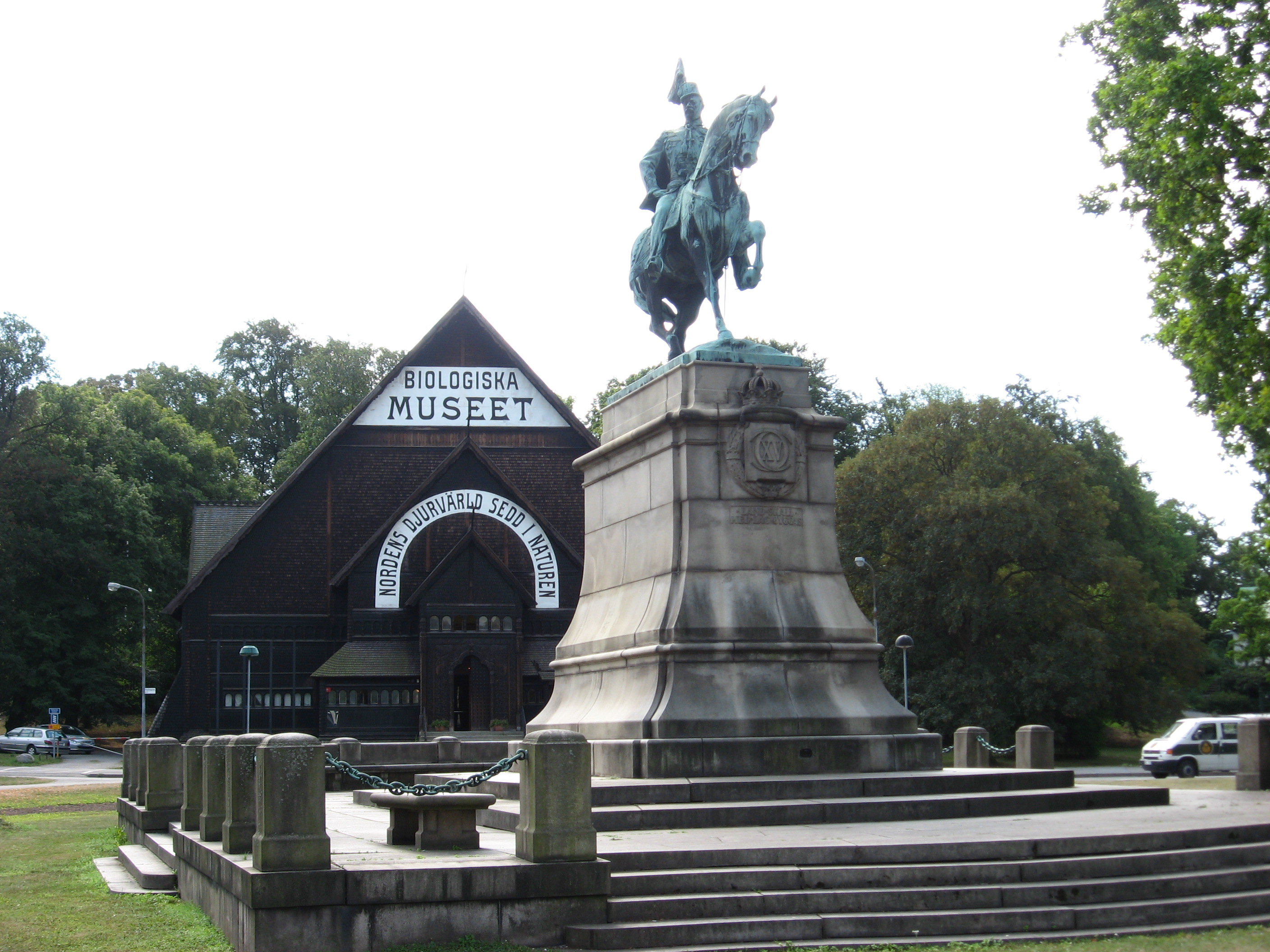
Biological Museum and a statue of King Charles XV

Besides the list below, a big portion of Djurgården consists of green areas offering footpaths and water front promenades among present or historical upper class residences and old institutional buildings, many of which are regarded as historical monuments of national interest.

- ABBA: The Museum
- Aquaria Water Museum – A small museum displaying a salmon ladder, an artificial rainforest and Nordic environments.
- Beckholmen – historical maritime environment including several dry docks and historical buildings.
- Biological Museum – Built in 1893, displaying stuffed animals in artificial environments representing various typical Swedish landscapes.
- Cirkus – Originally a circus, it today offers concerts and musical comedies.
- Djurgården line – heritage tramway operating since 1991.
- Djurgårdsstaden – a neighbourhood of preserved wooden buildings from the 18th century.
- Galärvarvet – Formerly a naval dockyard, today transformed into a popular park area including the Vasa Museum and Junibacken.
- Gröna Lund – A relatively small amusement park founded in 1883, besides the typical merry-go-rounds and roller coasters, it also offers concerts featuring international stars such as Miyavi, Bob Marley, and Damian Marley.
- Isbladskärret – a scenic lake popular among bird-watchers.
- Junibacken – A small fairy-tale world based mostly on the novels of Astrid Lindgren
- Liljevalchs konsthall – An art gallery built in 1916, well known for its spring exposition Vårsalongen in January–March, and its café Blå Porten.
- Nordic Museum – Displaying the largest collection of social history items in Sweden, ranging from doll's houses to fire engines.
- Rosendal Palace – Built in 1823–27 by Charles XIV John, renowned for its park.
- Rosendals Trädgård – public garden noted for its selection of roses.
- Skansen – World's oldest open-air museum displaying traditional Swedish architecture, and also the only zoo in Stockholm containing wolves, lynxes, elks, polar bears, and many other wild animals. Its traditional Christmas market attracts tens of thousands of people annually.
- Thiel Gallery – a museum displaying the collection of late-19th-century and early-20th-century art and crafts, originally collected by the banker Ernest Thiel.
- Waldemarsudde – Former mansion of Prince Eugen, transformed into a museum displaying Swedish 19th- and early-20th-century paintings and sculptures.
- Vasa Museum – A maritime museum displaying the only intact 17th-century ship. One of the most visited museums in Scandinavia.
- "Villa Solbacken" – Prince Bertil's former house, now owned by Prince Carl Philip.
- "Blockhusudden" – Prince Carl Philip's current home.

== Transport ==
Ways to get there include by foot, by tram from Sergels torg or by boat from Nybroplan, Skeppsholmen or Slussen. Nearby subway stations include Karlaplan metro station.

== See also ==
- Beckholmsbron
- Djurgårdens IF
- Djurgårdsbron
- Djurgårdsbrunnsbron
- Lilla Sjötullsbron

== Gallery ==
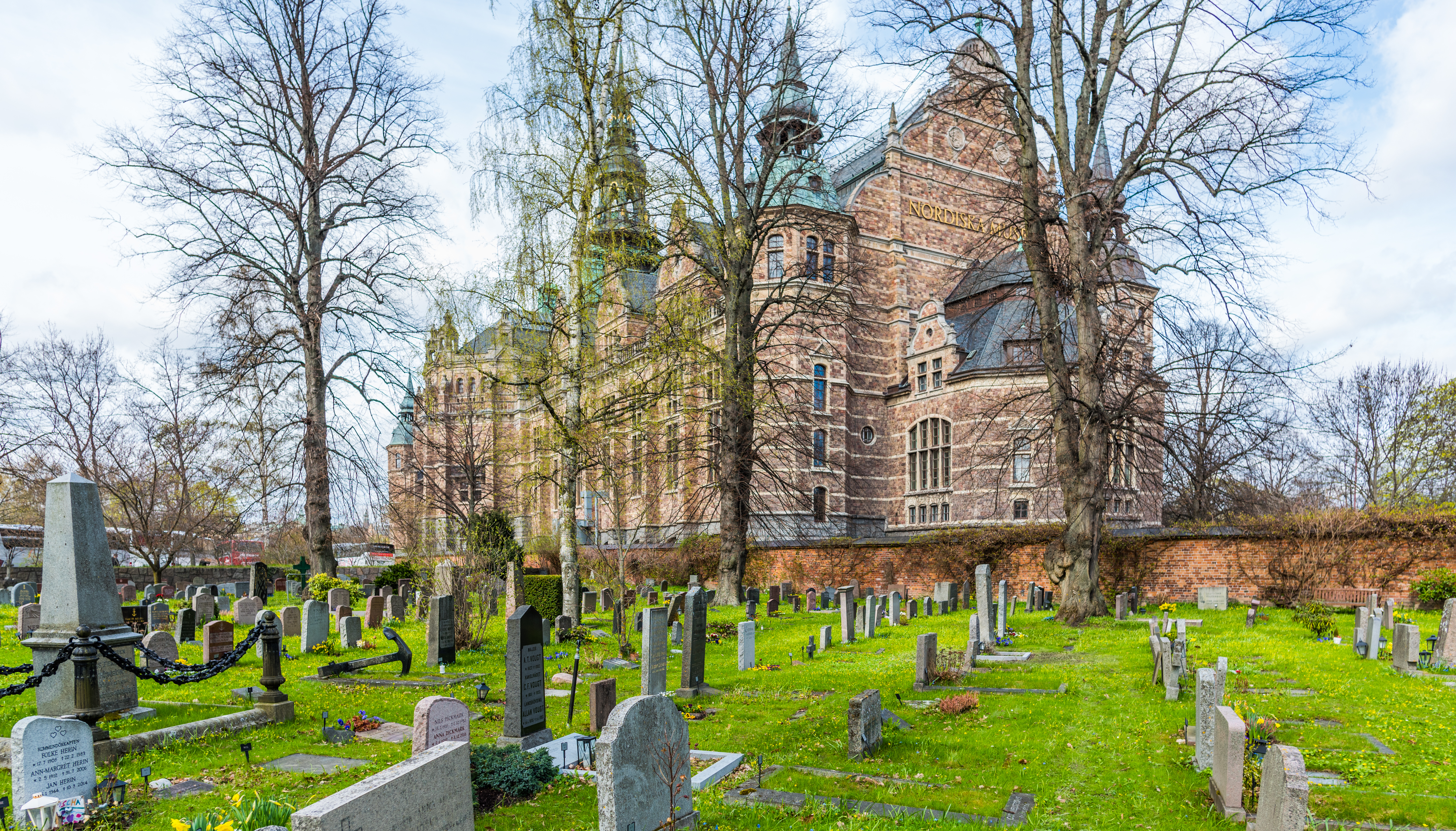

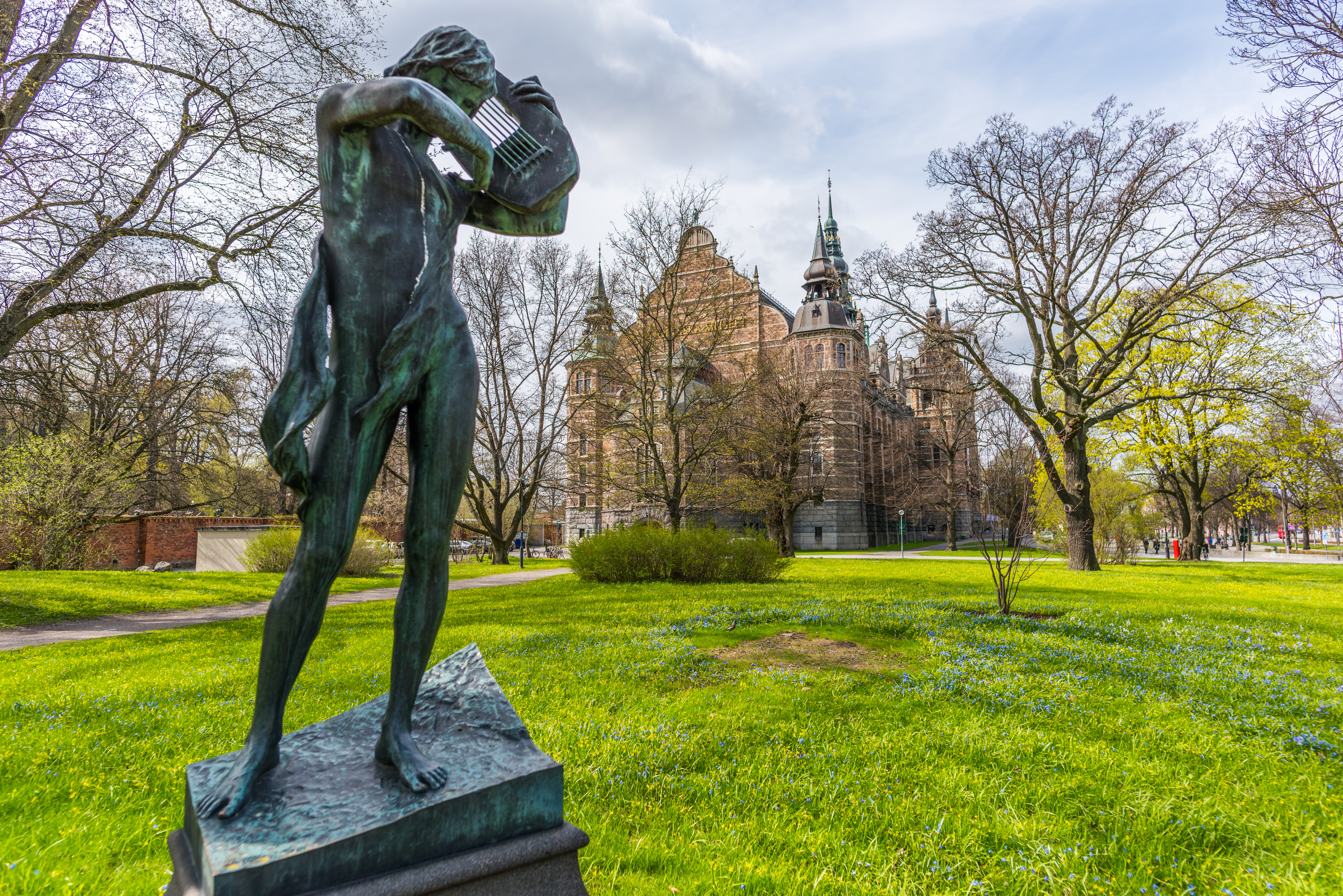

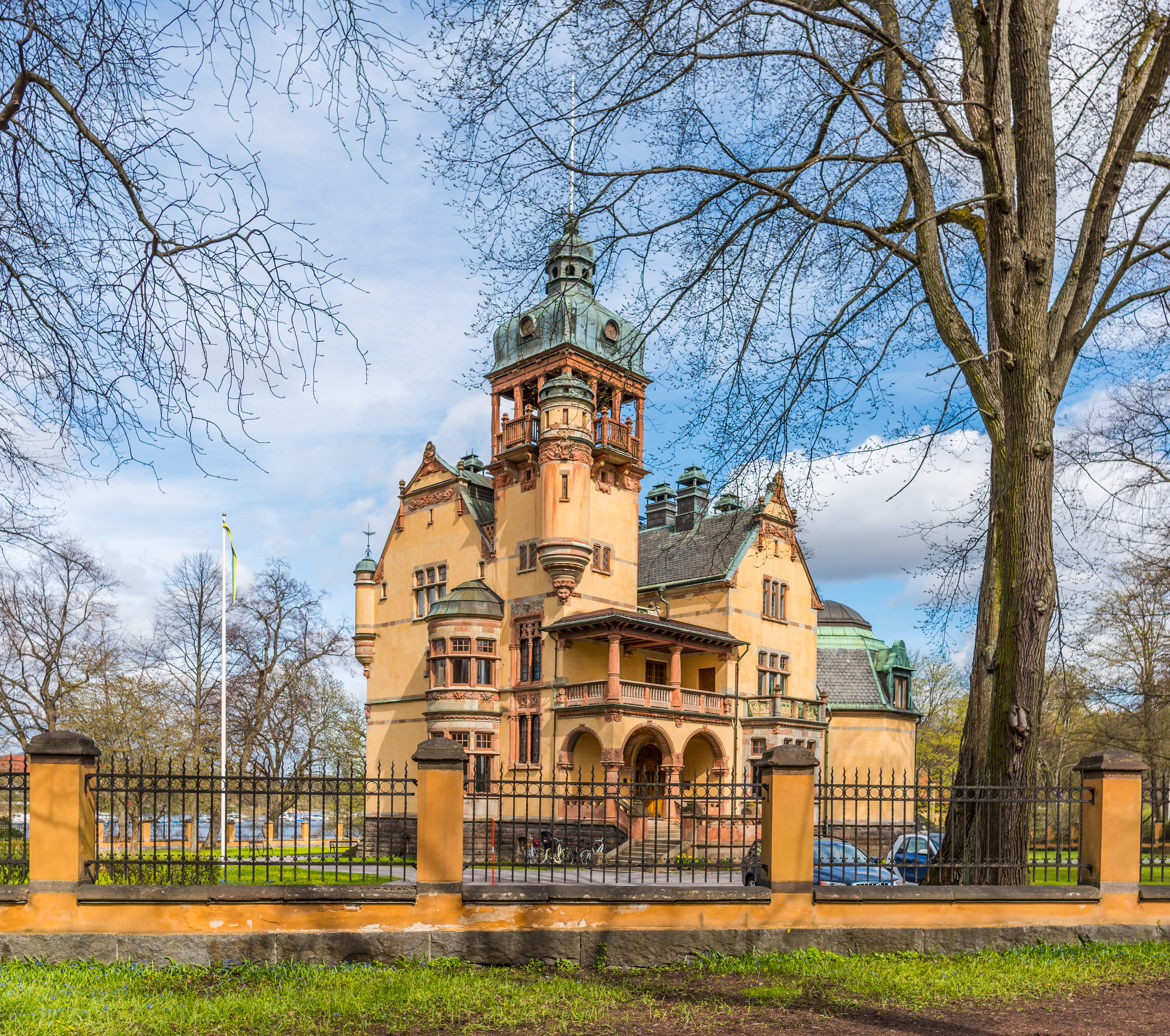

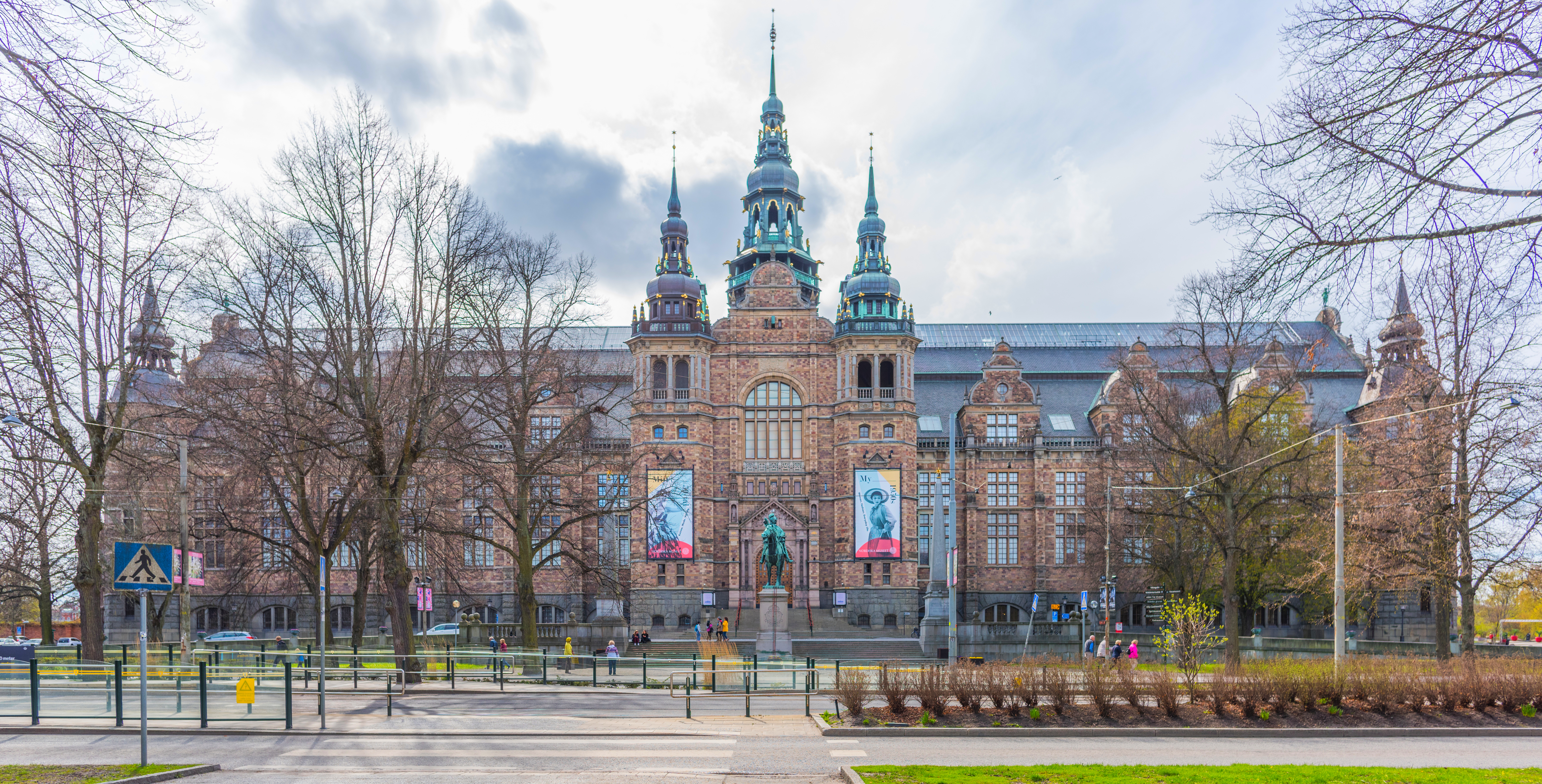

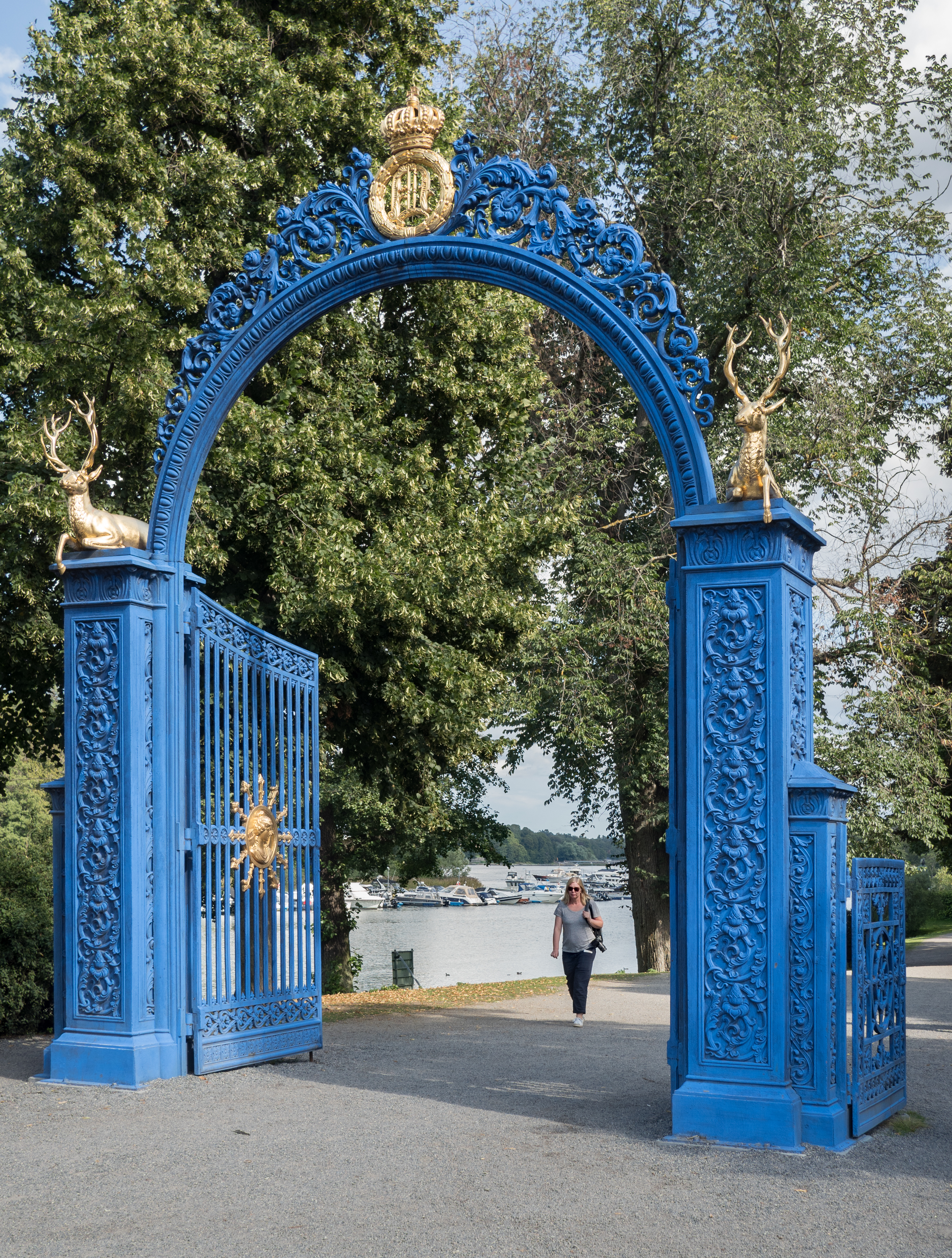

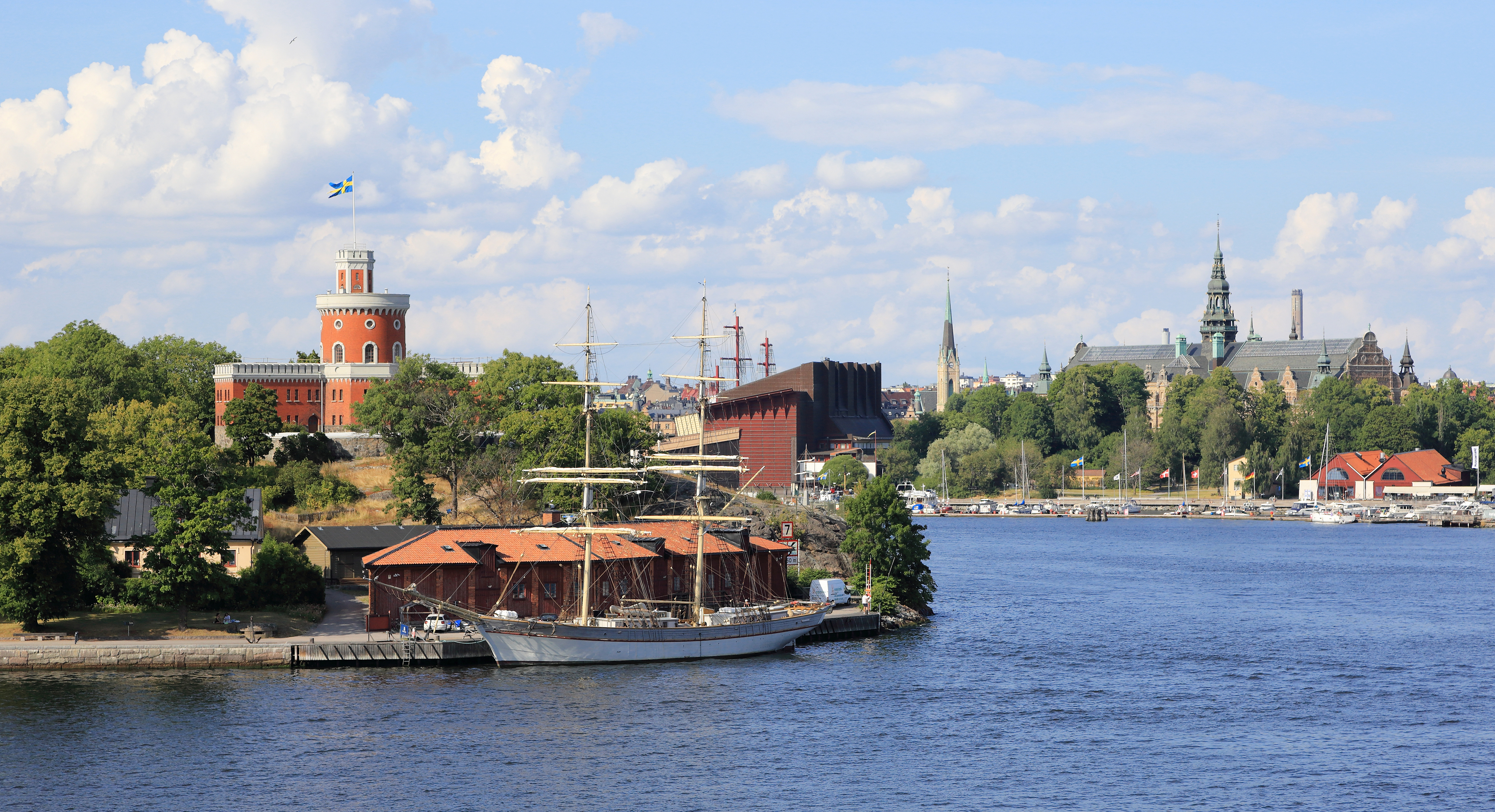
Vasa Museum and Nordic Museum with Kastellet in front
