= Albert Köhl =

French-Swedish chef de cuisine (1879–1959)

Julius Albert Köhl
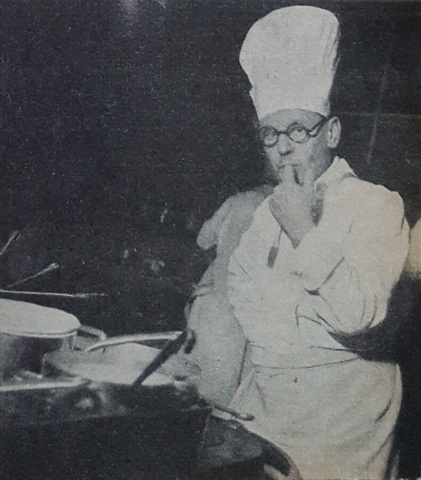
- Albert Köhl in Köksalmanack (1946)
- Born: Jules Albert Koehl; 25 December 1879; Strasbourg, Alsace-Lorraine, German Empire
- Died: 10 January 1954 (aged 74); Stockholm, Sweden
- Occupation: Chef
- Years active: 1898–1952
- Title: Chef de cuisine
- Spouse: Carolina (née Nordlander)
- Relatives: Edouard Dieffenbach (nephew); John Nordlander (brother-in-law)
- Culinary career
- Previous restaurants: Strand Hotel (1912–1955); Grand Hôtel (1906–1912)

Julius Albert Köhl (born Koehl, 1879–1954) was a French-Swedish chef de cuisine.

== Biography ==
Albert Koehl was born in 1879, and grew up in central Strasbourg, Alsace, then the German Empire, to Xavier Koehl, and Caroline (née Gresse), as well as uncle to Edouard Dieffenbach. Married to Carolina (née Nordlander) in 1912, he was brother-in-law of John Nordlander. Besides education in Strasbourg, and military service in the 1st Infantry Regiment of the Bavarian Army in Munich (1900–1902), his apprenticeship was carried out in Bavaria, France, Austria, and Italy.

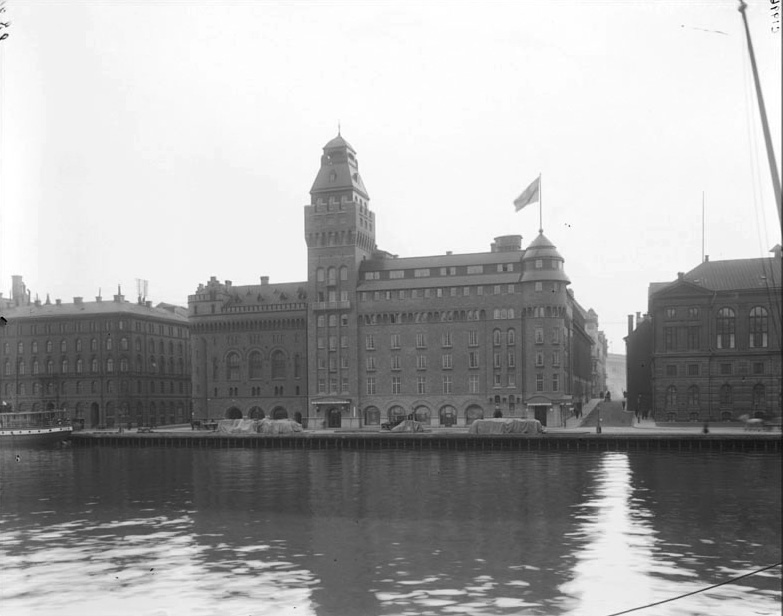
Strand Hotel on Blasieholmen in Stockholm, Sweden (1914).

After chef service at European restaurants including at Grand Hôtel 1906–1912 in Stockholm, Sweden, together with its former maître d'hôtel Julius Grönlund, he co-founded Strand Hotel for the 1912 Summer Olympics, operating as chef de cuisine 1912–1955. Offering Stockholm's largest banquet hall, adjoined to the Bååt palace on Blasieholmen, Strand rivaled contemporary Stockholm as preference for habitués such as Greta Garbo, Ingrid Bergman, Erik Harald Zetterström, along with international royals, politicians, and artists.

Naturalized in 1922, he was a keen hunter, fisherman, and member of the Odd Fellows. He died in 1954, buried at Norra begravningsplatsen. His grandson, Dan Koehl (born 28 October 1959), son of engineer Gösta Albert Köhl (1916–1996), is an elephant trainer.
