= Camel Corps =

Camel Corps may refer to:

== Military units ==
- Camel cavalry units in the Spanish, French, Italian and British colonial possessions in North Africa and the Middle East, for instance:
  - Méhariste, a camel mounted African unit in the French army
    - Free French Camel Corps, a camel cavalry unit of the Free French forces under General Charles de Gaulle during World War II in Eastern Africa
  - Tropas Nómadas, an auxiliary regiment to the colonial army in Spanish Sahara (1930s–1975)

== Military formations ==
- United States Camel Corps, a mid-nineteenth century experiment by the United States Army in using camels as pack animals in the Southwest United States
- Scinde Camel Corps, an infantry regiment of the British Indian Army (1843–1853)
- Egyptian Camel Corps, fighting in the Battle of Kirbekan and Ginnis (both 1885)
- Camel Corps (Gordon Relief Expedition), a camel corps in the Desert Column of the Gordon Relief Expedition (1884–85) under the command of Herbert Stewart, earning their colours in the Battle of Abu Klea
- Egyptian Camel Transport Corps, active 1914–1919
- Imperial Camel Corps, an Allied unit that fought in the Sinai and Palestine Campaign during World War I (1916–1919)
- Somaliland Camel Corps, a unit of the British Army based in British Somaliland (1914–1944)
- Sudan Camel Corps ('the Hajana'), a battalion in the Sudan Defence Force (1925–1950s)
- Bikaner Camel Corps, a unit of Imperial Service Troops from India (1889–present)

== Other ==
- Camel Corps, nickname for British Foreign Office officials in the Middle East, see Adel Darwish
