= Diefenbacher =

Diefenbacher is a German language surname. Notable people with the surname include:

- Frank Diefenbacher (born 1982), German racing driver
- Michel Diefenbacher (1947–2017), French politician

== See also ==
- Diefenbach (surname)
- Dieffenbach (surname)
