= List of historic buildings in Sweden =

== Castles and fortresses ==
- Älvsborg Fortress (Gothenburg)
- Bjärka-Säby Castle (Linköping)
- Castle Boo (Hjortkvarn)
- Bohus Fortress (Kungälv)
- Borgholm Castle (Borgholm)
- Brahehus
- Carlsten Fortress (Marstrand)
- Christinehov Castle (Andrarum)
- Dalaborg
- Dagsnäs Castle (Bjurum)
- Ekenäs Castle (Ekenäs)
- Eketorp (Öland)
- Ekolsund Castle
- Eriksberg Manor
- Glimmingehus
- Gråborg
- Gripenberg Castle
- Gripsholm Castle (Mariefred)
- Gunnebo Castle
- Göksholm Castle
- Hörningsholm Castle
- Ismantorp Fortress
- Johannishus Castle (Johannishus)
- Kalmar Castle (Kalmar)
- Karlberg Castle
- Karlsborg Fortress (Karlsborg)
- Kärnan (Helsingborg)
- Krapperup Castle
- Läckö Castle (Kållandsö)
- Leufsta / Lövstabruk (near Tierp)
- Löfstad Castle (Norrköping)
- Mariedal Castle (Lundsbrunn)
- Mårbacka
- Mälsåker Castle
- Maltesholm Castle
- Nääs Castle (Lerum near Gothenburg)
- Nynäs Castle
- Örebro Castle (Örebro)
- Öster-Malma Castle
- Övedskloster Castle
- Pålsjö Castle
- Penningby Castle
- Rosersberg Castle (Rosersberg)
- Runsa
- Rydboholm Castle (Vaxholm)
- Salnecke Castle
- Salsta Castle
- Sandemar Castle
- Sjöö Castle
- Skansen Crown (Gothenburg)
- Skokloster Castle (Slottskogen)
- Skottorp Castle (Skottorp)
- Sofiero Palace (Helsingborg)
- Sövdeborg Castle
- Stenhammar Palace
- Steninge Palace (Märsta)
- Sturefors Castle
- Sturehov Castle
- Sundbyholm Castle
- Svaneholm Castle
- Tjolöholm Castle
- Torup Castle
- Torpa Stenhus
- Trollenäs Castle
- Tynnelsö Castle
- Tyresö Castle
- Uppsala Castle
- Vadstena Castle
- Venngarn Castle
- Vittskövle Castle
- Wik Castle

== Palaces ==
- Bååt Palace (Stockholm)
- Bonde Palace (Stockholm)
- Drottningholm Palace (Lövö)
- Hallwyl Palace (Stockholm)
- Sager House (Stockholm)
- Solliden Palace, (Borgholm)
- Stenbock Palace (Stockholm)
- Stockholm Palace (Stockholm)
- Strömsholm Palace (Strömsholm)
- Tessin Palace (Stockholm)
- Tullgarn Palace
- Ulriksdal Palace (Solna near Stockholm)
- Wrangel Palace (Stockholm)

== Churches and monasteries ==
- Alvastra Abbey (Ruins)
- Gothenburg Cathedral (Gothenburg)
- Husaby Church (Husaby)
- Jokkmokks Church (Jokkmokk)
- Katarina kyrka (Church of St. Catherine) (Stockholm)
- Kalmar Cathedral (Kalmar)
- Kiruna kyrka (Kiruna)
- Linköping Cathedral (Linköping)
- Lund Cathedral (Lund)
- Mariestad Cathedral (Mariestad)
- Masthuggskyrkan (Gothenburg)
- Storkyrkan, Stockholm Cathedral, or Church of St. Nicholas (Stockholm)
- Nydala Monastery
- Roma Abbey
- Skara Cathedral (Skara)
- Trefaldighetskyrkan (Karlskrona)
- German Church or Tyska kyrkan (Stockholm)
- Uppsala Cathedral (Uppsala)
- Varnhem Monastery (Varnhem)
- Vadstena Abbey (Vadstena)
- Vittskövle Church (Kristianstad Municipality)

== Other historic buildings ==
- Bollhuset (Stockholm)
- Gathenhiemska huset (Gothenburg)
- Halltorps (Öland)
- Kronhuset (Gothenburg)
- Lejonkulan (Stockholm)
- City Museum of Gothenburg (Gothenburg)
- Swedish House of Lords (Stockholm)
- Stockholm City Hall (Stockholm)
- Västra/Östra boställshuset (Stockholm)

== See also ==
- Architecture of Sweden
- Listed buildings in Sweden
