= Architecture of Sweden =

This article covers the architecture of Sweden from a historical perspective.

As is the norm in the history of architecture, the architectural history of a nation naturally lends itself to the history of its monuments, and to the development of that nation's institutions of power: palaces, castles, and churches. This also applies in the case of the history of architecture in Sweden. The break comes with the modern era, with the change in the role of architects in society, towards a concern with questions concerning the entire population, such as housing and the infrastructure of a social democracy.

== Middle Ages ==
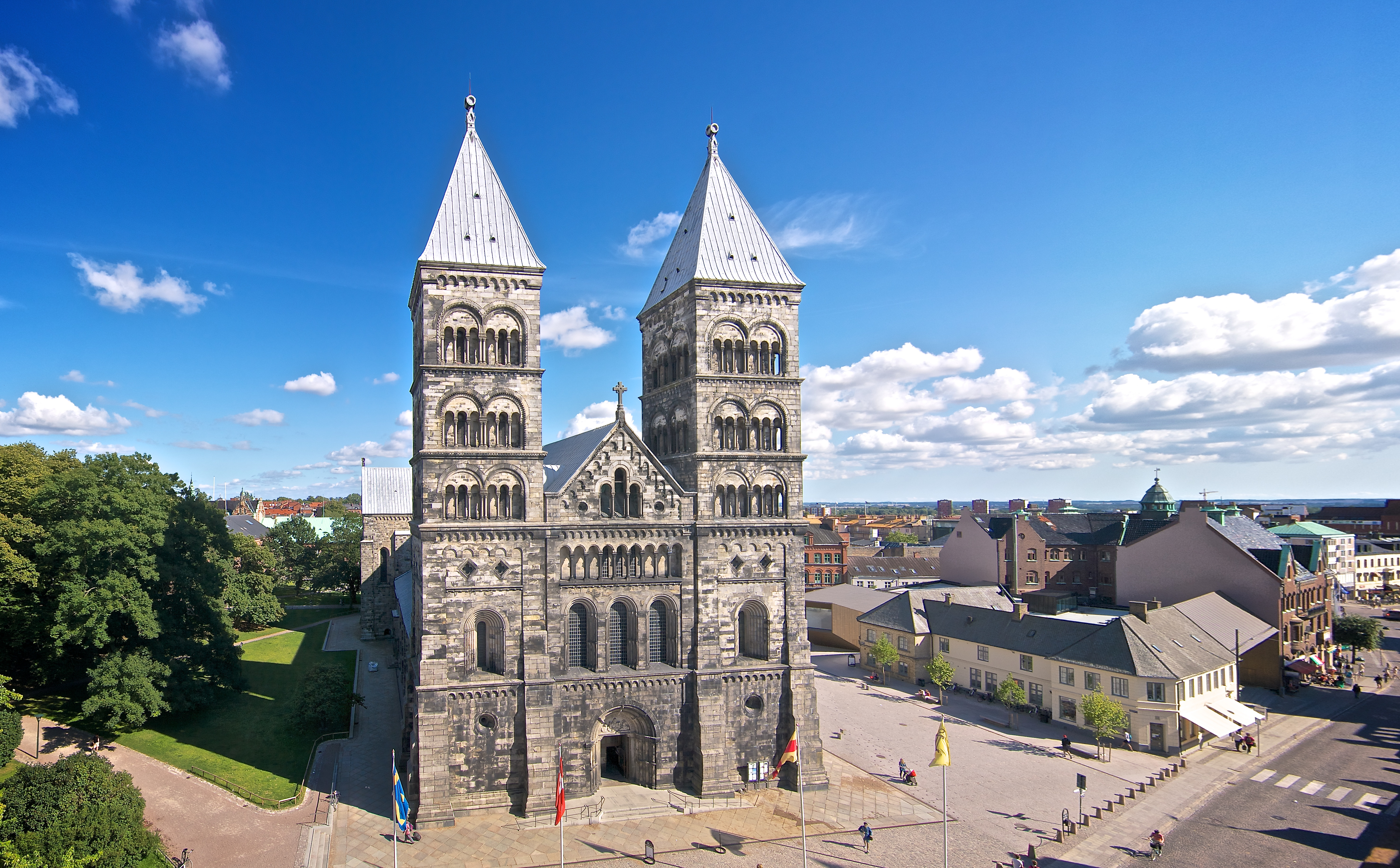
Lund Cathedral in Lund, Scania

In Sweden, the Middle Ages lasted for approximately 500 years, from the baptism of Olof of Sweden in 1000 AD until Gustav I of Sweden seized power in 1523. At first almost all buildings, urban and rural, were constructed of timber. In the 12th century, stone became the predominant building material for the construction of Romanesque monasteries and churches. Notable examples are Lund Cathedral, Sigtuna monastery, Husaby Church and Alvastra monastery. The smaller Romanesque churches in the countryside were often fortified. The medieval churches on Gotland constitute a group of unusually well-preserved medieval churches, also compared with the rest of Europe.

The advent of the Brick Gothic style brought brick to Sweden as a new building material. The cathedrals of Västerås, Strängnäs and Uppsala were all constructed of brick, whereas the cathedrals of Skara and Linköping were made of limestone.

While about 1,500 of Sweden's 4,000 churches date to the Middle Ages, very few secular buildings survive from this period. There are, however, a few burgher's houses in Stockholm and Visby, some castles, fortresses, and fortifications. The 13th century city walls around Visby are some of the best-preserved medieval city walls in Europe. The street layout of Stockholm's Old City is still medieval. In other Swedish cities secular buildings from the Middle Ages are very rare and often heavily rebuilt during the following centuries. One example of that is Skytteanum in Uppsala.

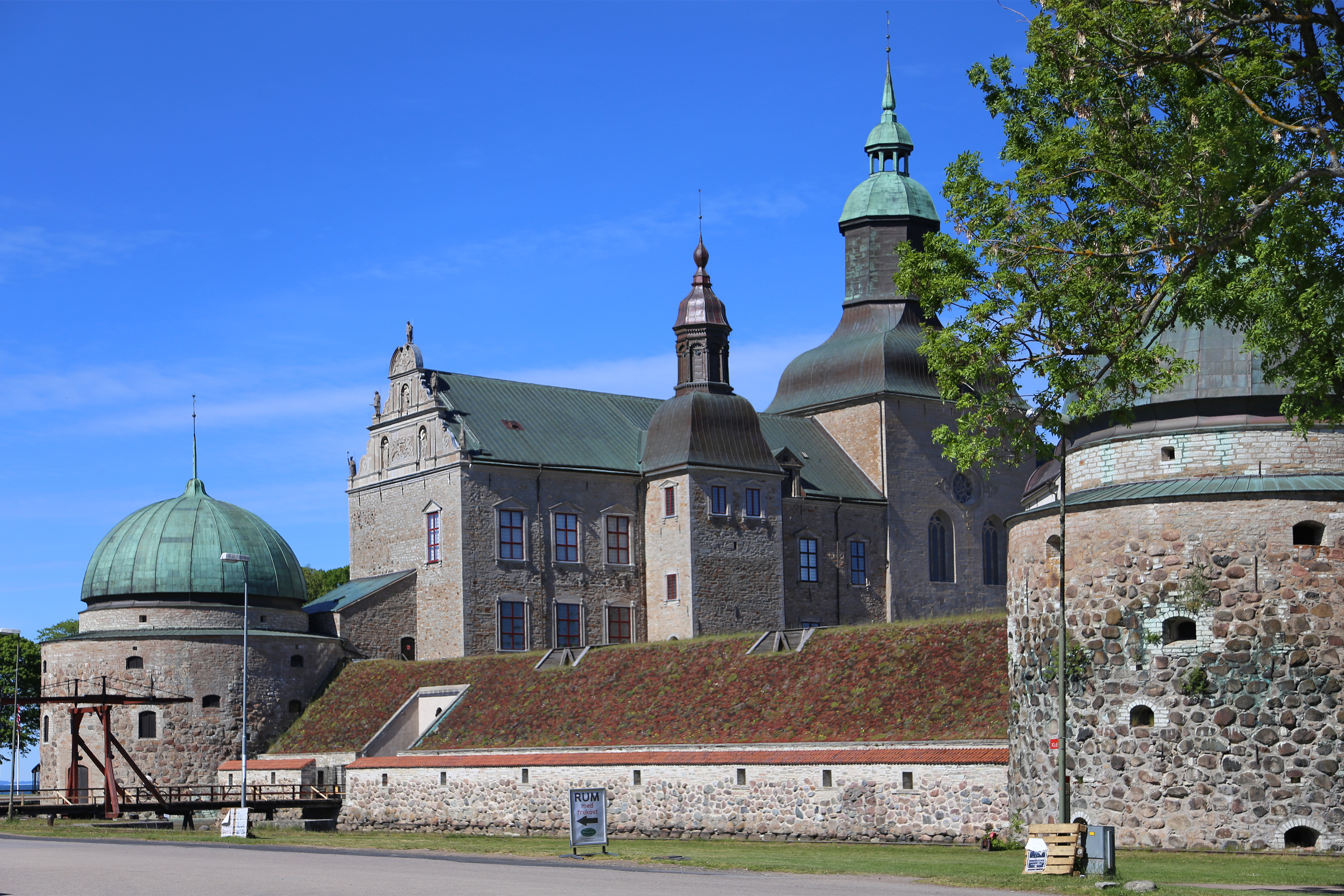
Vadstena Castle, a fine example of Renaissance architecture

== Baroque ==
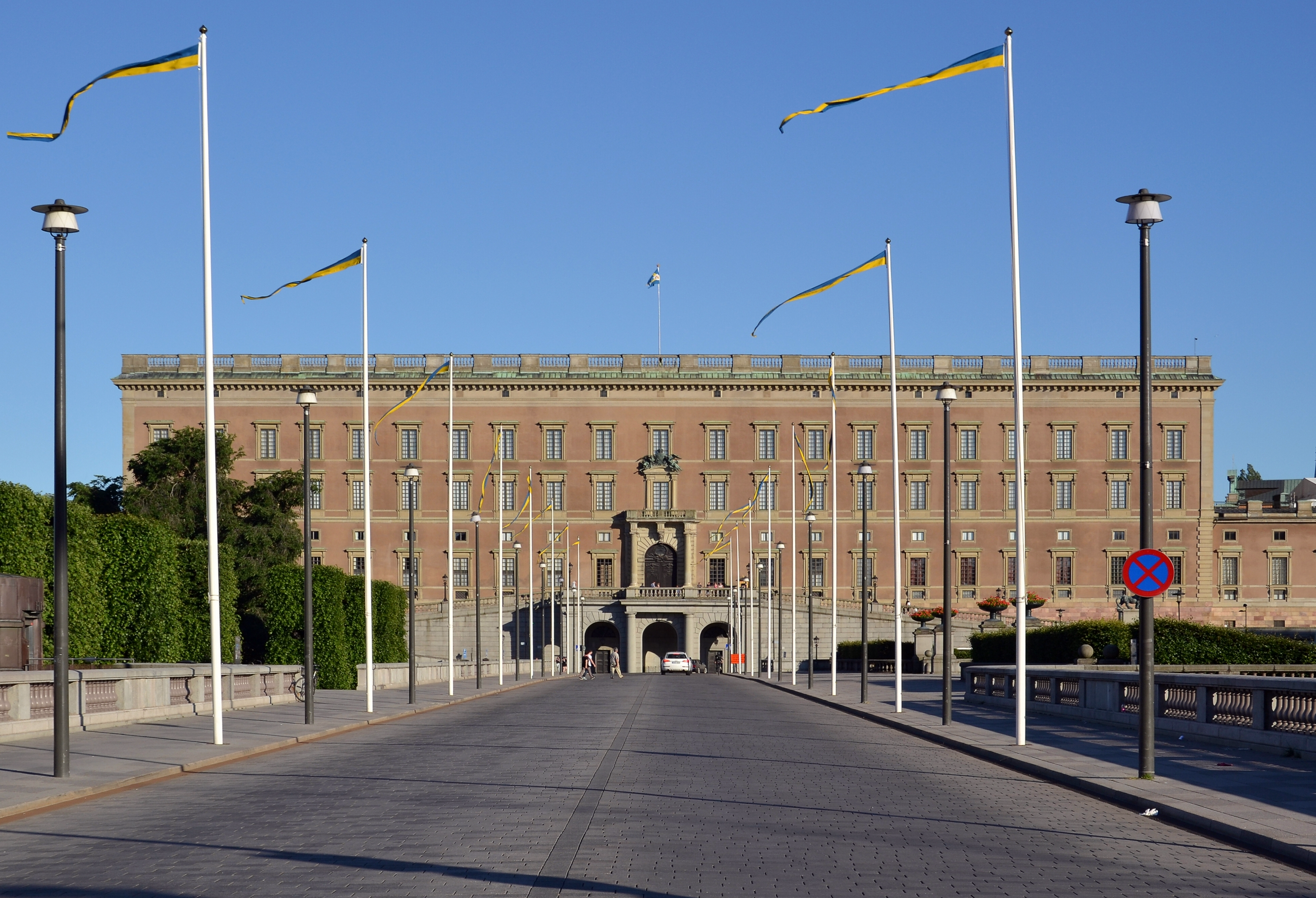
The Stockholm Palace

After the rise of Sweden as a great power, in the 17th century, the aristocracy began to build again. At the same time, the notion of the architect was established and the profession developed, its reputation bolstered by the works of Simon de la Vallée and Nicodemus Tessin the Elder. Numerous city palaces and Landschlösser were built following Western European, and above all, French models. Additionally, the building of churches was resumed. Katarina Church in Stockholm became the model for many buildings and churches in the realm. The work of renowned architect Nicodemus Tessin the Younger moved architectural development in Sweden into High Baroque; examples include Stockholm Palace and Kalmar Cathedral, as well as the completion of the Drottningholm Palace.

The 17th century also saw the founding of a number of cities. They were set out with a regular Grid plan street pattern with central squares. The exceptions to this are the Danish Skåne and in Gothenburg, which were laid out to Dutch models in 1619 and include canals. The designs are still recognisable today, even where the original timber buildings have now perished.

== Classicism and Empire style ==
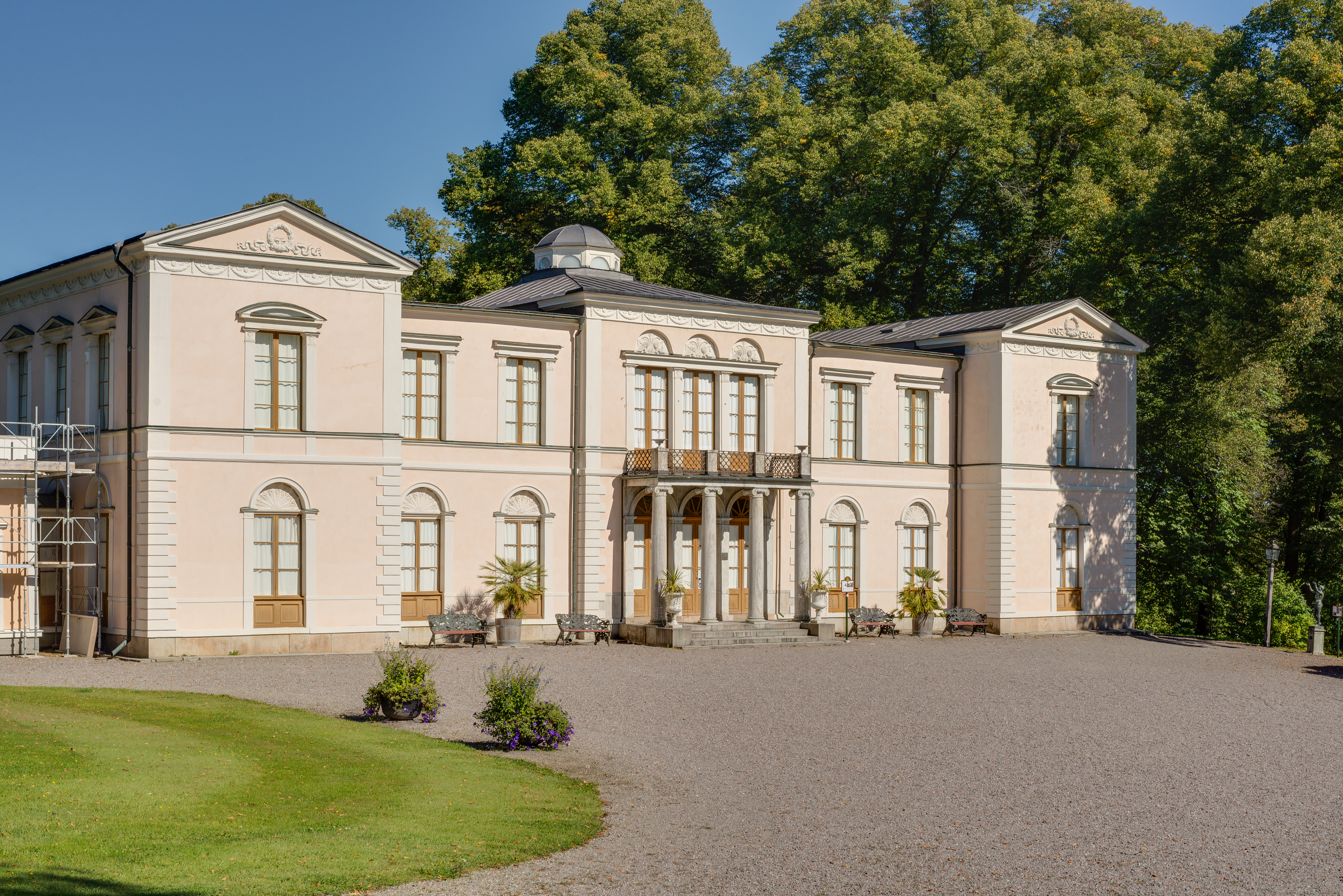
Rosendal Palace in Empire style

In the second half of the 18th century, particularly after the coup of Gustav III a new direction was taken employing classical precedents. In 1773 the Building School of the Academy of Arts was founded, shortly afterwards the Office for Supervision of the Building Industry was instituted. Both raised the quality of architecture, but at the expense of local building traditions. Testimony to the new classical ideals in architecture can be found in the Palace Theatre in Gripsholm, the Botany building in Uppsala or the high school in Härnösand.

After the Napoleonic Wars and the loss of Finland, national building activity was concentrated within the military sector. The Karlsborg Fortress and the Göta Canal, employing 60,000 men in a 23-year period, were the largest Swedish building projects of all time. The leading architect of the first half of the 19th century was also a soldier, Colonel Fredrik Blom, he designed a series of barracks and also the classically styled Skeppsholmen Church in Stockholm and, as the house architect to the royal family, he built the Rosendal Palace.

== Revivalism ==
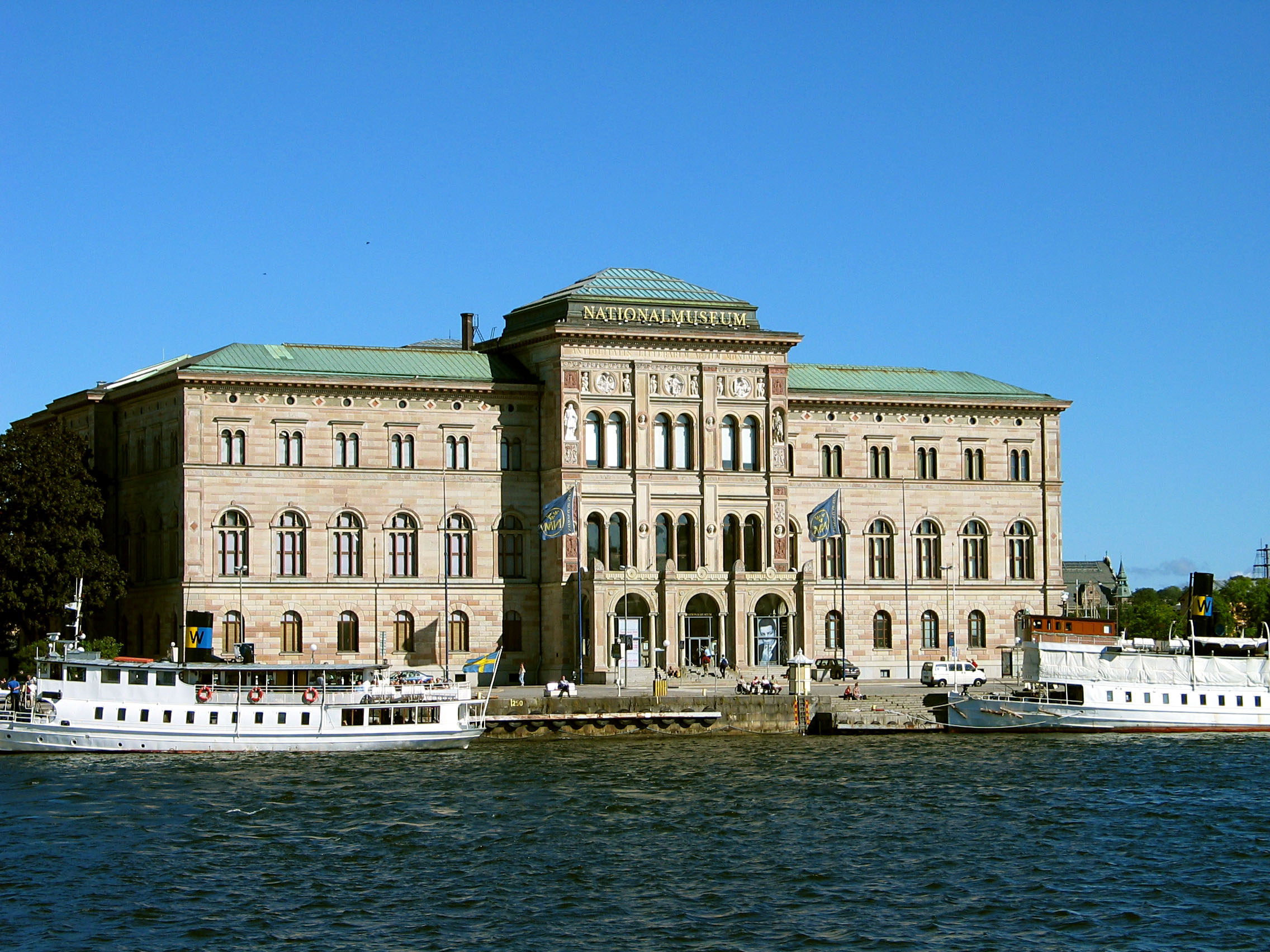
The National Museum of Fine Arts

In the second half of the 19th century the industrialisation of Sweden began. The population of the cities tripled in the space of a few decades. This rapid urbanisation lead to prolific construction activity: tenement houses and public buildings such as schools, hospitals, prisons, hotels, banks, market halls, theatres and churches were built. An eclectic historicism distinguishes many of the buildings. The German Friedrich August Stüler received the prestigious commission for building the National Museum of Fine Arts, which he designed in Renaissance Revival style. Fredrik Wilhelm Scholander's Stockholm Synagogue is inspired by Assyrian architecture. His pupil Helgo Zettervall, followed in his footsteps with the comprehensive renovations to the cathedrals of Uppsala, Skara and Linköping, which express his interpretation of the Gothic style. Johan Fredrik Åbom, the most prolific Swedish architect of his age, designed numerous churches and a series of Burgher houses in Neo-Renaissance style. The Berns Salonger with its restaurant and stages is also a notable expression of the new civic pride, as immortalised in August Strindberg's novel The Red Room.

== National Romantic style and Jugendstil ==
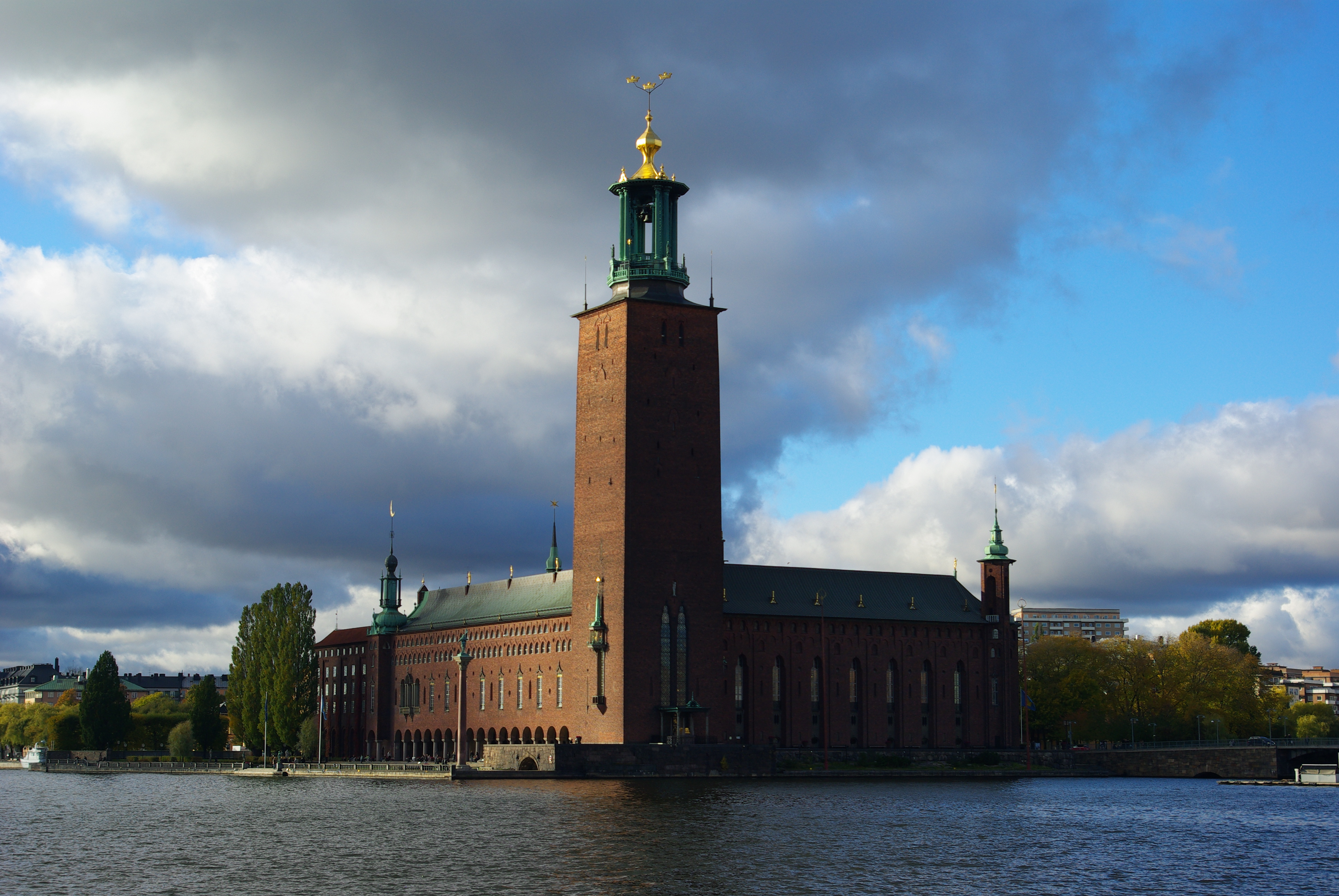
The Stockholm City Hall

At the end of the 19th century and the beginning of the 20th century a new generation of architects emerged who turned away from historicism and classicism. On the one hand they absorbed influences from abroad, e.g. the Jugendstil execution of the Royal Dramatic Theatre in Stockholm, on the other hand they looked for precedents in Swedish cultural history and Swedish building traditions. From this search they developed the National Romantic Style, which took the cultural and building precedents and merged them with ideas from the English Arts and Crafts Movement to create a very distinct Swedish architecture often in brick and wood. Carl Westman's Swedish General Medical Association building in Stockholm was one of the first buildings built in the style, with the Röhss Museum in Gothenburg and Stockholm Court House providing two further examples. The crowning achievement of the National Romantic Style is the Stockholm City Hall, designed by Ragnar Östberg and built between 1903 and 1923.

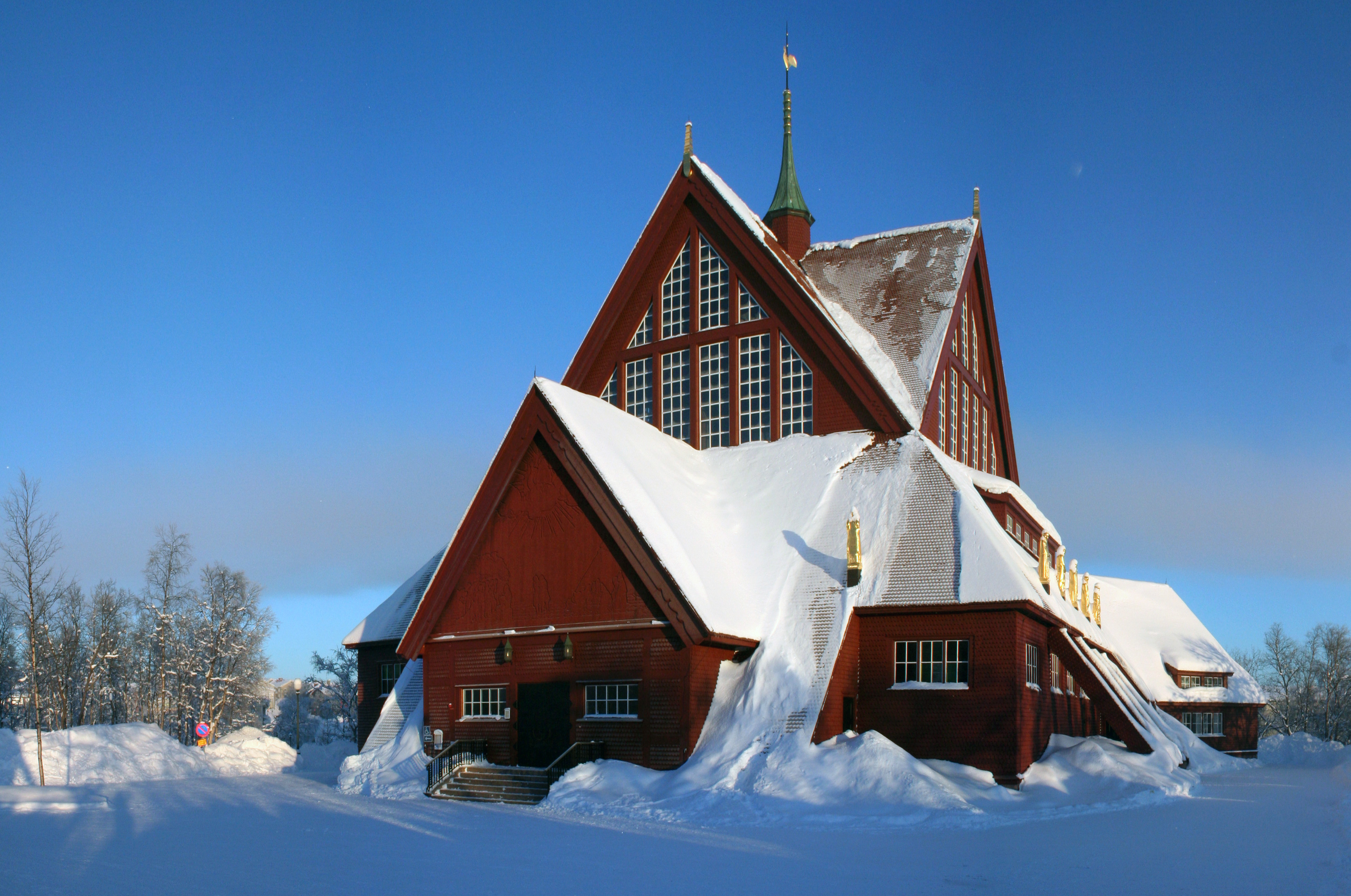
Kiruna Church

Gustaf Wickman dedicated himself to a task of a different nature when he built the entire city of Kiruna within three decades in an uninhabited wilderness. Although the city of Kiruna caused many problems for the indigenous Sami people, disrupting reindeer herding routes and polluting the area. After a rich source of iron ore was found and a railway line built, Wickman was charged with the design of the city. Within a few years, he had completed the design and construction of the directors and engineers villas, the worker's housing, offices, schools, a hospital, a fire station, the post office and bank, and a swimming pool. Amongst his best work is the Kiruna Church designed in the National Romantic style. Its timber construction demonstrates and connects the influences of Norwegian Stave churches and American architectural traditions.

== Modern and postmodern ==
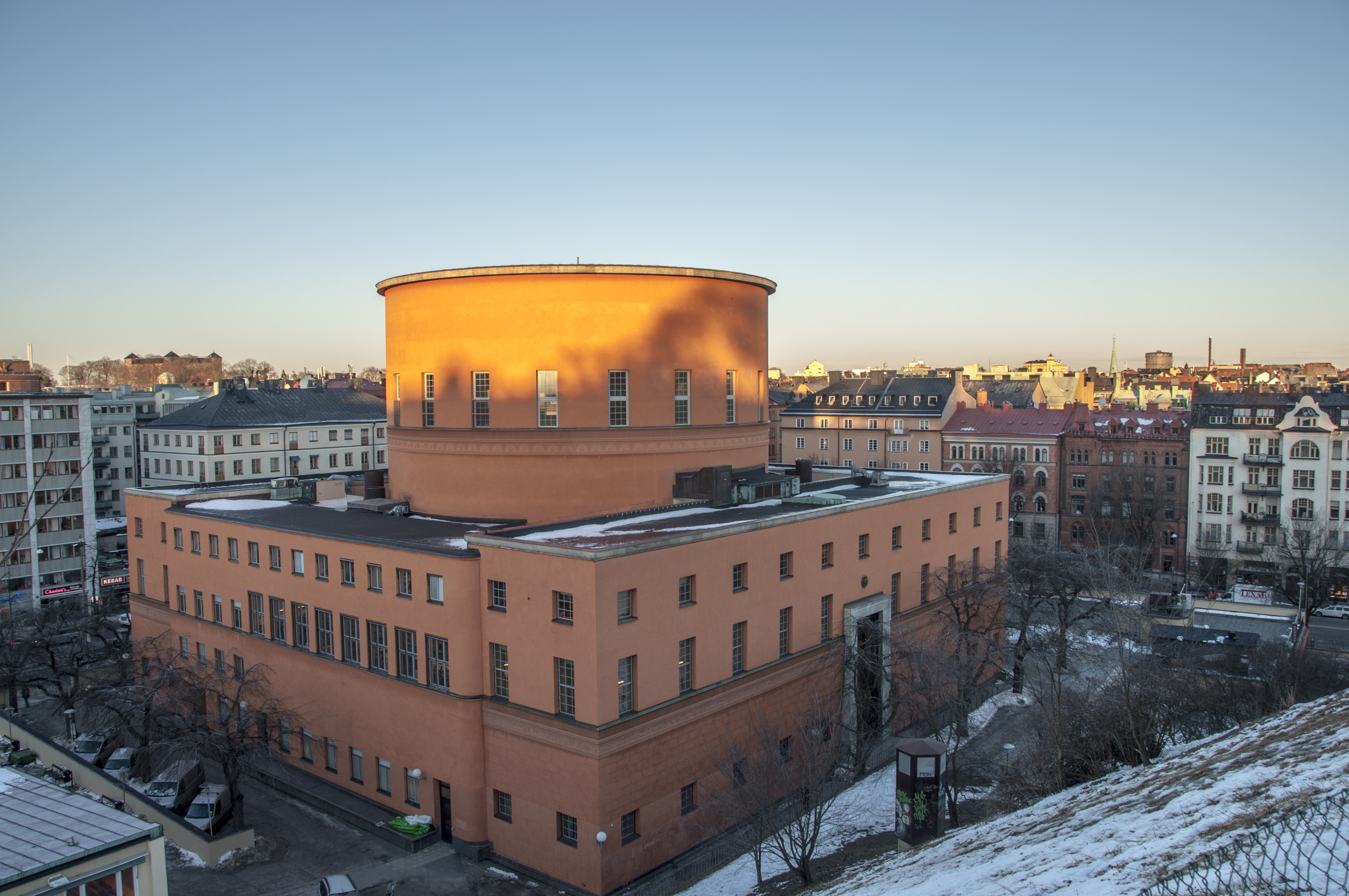
Stockholm Public Library

Modern architecture in Sweden was prefaced by a group of architects who took up a very rigorous and stark form of Neo-classicism. Gunnar Asplund and Ivar Tengbom were two of the most well-known representatives during the 1910s and 1920s, contributing to the style which became known internationally as Swedish Grace. Asplund's most important works include the Listers District Court House in Sölvesborg, Stockholm Public Library and, in collaboration with Sigurd Lewerentz, both the (temporary) Stockholm Exhibition (1930) and the Stockholm South (Woodland) Cemetery (today a UNESCO World Heritage Site).

The Stockholm Exhibition for Industry, Arts and Crafts 1930 helped Functionalism break-through in Sweden. In the forthcoming years—particularly in housing—this was to become the dominant ideology. A typical example of the strong link between Functionalism and the political left is the Kvarnholmen quarter in Nacka, designed in the 1930s by the architecture department of the Consumer Cooperative which was founded in 1924 as the first collectively organised architects practice.

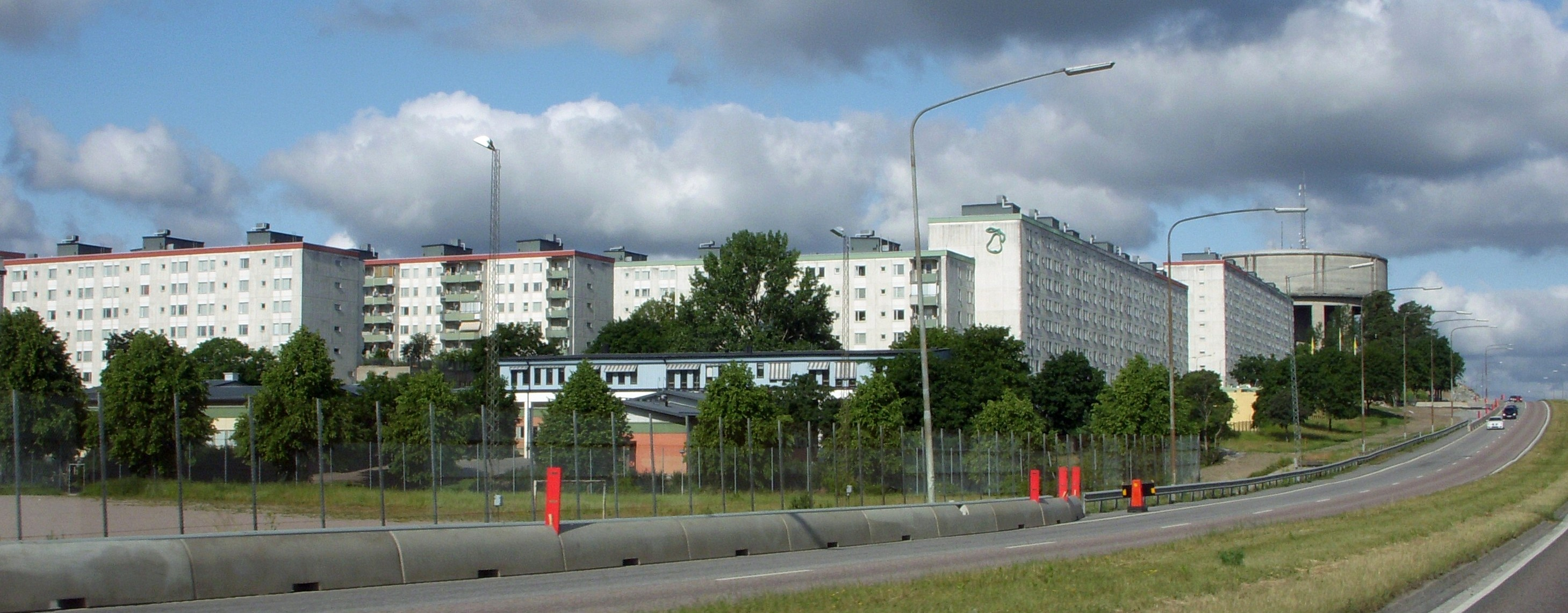
Housing construction during the Million programme in the Tensta district in Stockholm

Despite these initiatives, housing standards in Sweden were low. After the Second World War a massive building project was undertaken to satisfy the housing shortage and improve standards. In 1965 the government announced the Million Programme—the building of a million new dwellings within ten years (with a population of 7.8 million). Entire dormitory suburbs were built within a very short time. Land in many city centre areas was purchased and replanned in a modern and functional way to make room for offices. The enormous building projects were planned and led by large architects' offices. Often the quality of buildings and their design were of secondary importance to the delivery of such large numbers of projects.

The 1973 oil crisis put an end to the Million Programme. Even before this, the programme was receiving vociferous criticism against the pattern book architecture and negative social consequences which these buildings produced.

Out of this criticism, the term postmodern emerged in Sweden, encompassing a variety of different trends. A rich use of form developed that had not been seen since the National Romantic Style. One of the most important exponents of postmodernism in Sweden was the British-born Ralph Erskine. Today, architecture in Sweden is being defined by such architects as Gert Wingårdh, who started as a postmodernist, but is known to pick up new trends (the works show influences from ecological design as well as Minimalism, High-tech, Expressionism, and Neofunctionalism).

== See also ==
- List of historic buildings in Sweden
- Listed buildings in Sweden
- Architecture of Stockholm
- Decorated Farmhouses of Hälsingland
