= Free French Camel Corps =

- Badge of the Free French Camel Corps with the Cross of Lorraine, symbol of the Free French Forces
- Active: September 1941 to February 1942
- Country: French Somaliland
- Allegiance: Free France
- Branch: Cavalry
- Type: Méhariste camel cavalry
- Engagements: Italian conquest of British Somaliland; East African Campaign; Battle of Dakar; Liberation of Paris

Commanders
- Notable commanders: Captain Edouard Dieffenbach

The Free French Camel Corps (French: Corps de Méharistes Français Libres) was a méhariste camel cavalry unit of the Free French forces, founded by among others Captain Edouard Dieffenbach, under command of General Charles de Gaulle during World War II.

== History ==
Co-founded in Djibouti by Alsatian First World War veteran Captain Edouard Dieffenbach as deputy commander, first set up as the Free French Camel Platoon (French: Peloton méhariste français libre), the unit was later renamed the Free French Camel Corps (French: Corps de méharistes français libres). It was active from September 1941 to February 1942, with initial strength estimated to about 15-20 camels along with riders. Among the troops, apart from Edouard Dieffenbach, was Lieutenant Magendie, Adjutant Emile Cayre, Sergents Battaglini, Sergeant Carbuccia (a Corsican who was killed in action for France in the Italian Campaign), Corporal Farner, physician, Commander Griveau and about 14 other compatriots.

The unit was stationed in areas equivalent to today's Somalia, Ethiopia and Eritrea, then under occupation.

The unit notably fought alongside the British Somaliland Camel Corps and saw action in East Africa.
