= Listed buildings in Sweden =

Buildings with historical and cultural protection in Sweden

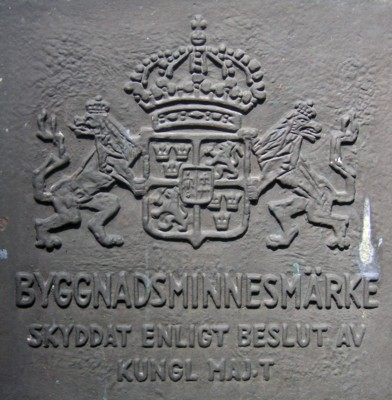
Sign for a Byggnadsminne by Turkiska kiosken in Hagaparken. The sign says: Byggnadsminne – Protected by decision of the King in Council

Swedish traffic sign for "Area of Interest"

A listed building in Sweden (Swedish: byggnadsminne) enjoys the strongest legal, cultural, and historical protection available. Listed buildings range widely from Medieval castles to a cinema from the 1950s. The listing is not restricted to buildings per se; parks, gardens or other sites of cultural or historical significance are also protected by law. Listed buildings recount the passage of history and how Swedish society has changed over time. More than 2,000 buildings and sites have been protected as listed buildings in Sweden.

The purpose of listing buildings and environments is to protect traces of history that have had great significance for the understanding of today's society and to guarantee people's access to the Swedish cultural heritage. To protect the cultural and historical value of the buildings, Swedish law provides protective measures to be taken for each such listed building or site.

There are two kinds of listed buildings: individual and government.

== Individual listed buildings ==
The County administrative boards of Sweden have the authority, through the third chapter of the Cultural memory law, to list those buildings and sites whose "cultural and historical value is especially notable or which are part of an especially notable site". This can pertain to personal housing as well as industrial buildings, parks and bridges.

The County Administrative Boards decide whether a building is to be listed. Anyone can initiate the process deciding about a listing with the county. The County Board also has the authority to initiate such processes on its own initiative, and to rule in cases regarding actions that conflict with the protective measures. Private persons who own a listed building have the right to apply for subsidies for costs incurred in for instance restorations.

There are over 2,000 individual listed buildings in Sweden.

== Governmental listed buildings ==
There are about 260 governmental listed buildings, for example government and court houses, defensive structures such as fortresses, bridges, royal palaces and lighthouses. The governmental listed buildings are owned by the state and recount important parts of the history of Sweden and its government.

The government of Sweden decides whether a governmental building or site is to be listed. Swedish National Heritage Board submits suggested new governmental listed buildings and is responsible for their maintenance. Objects in Sweden that are listed are protected according to the law of cultural heritage (kulturminneslagen or KML) and the ordinance of governmental listed buildings (förordningen om statliga byggnadsminnen). Decisions regarding listed buildings are announced by Administrative Board in the respective county. Record keeping is administered by the National Heritage Board.

== See also ==
- Architecture of Sweden
- List of historic buildings in Sweden
- Listing of historic ships in Sweden
- Blue plaque
