= Diefenbach (surname) =

Diefenbach is a surname. Notable people with the surname include:

- Jasper Diefenbach (born 1988), Dutch volleyball player;
- Karl Wilhelm Diefenbach (1851–1913), German painter and social reformer;
- Lorenz Diefenbach (1806–1883), German philologist and lexicographer.

== See also ==
- Dieffenbach (surname)
- Dieffenbach (disambiguation)
