= Dieffenbach =

Dieffenbach may refer to:

People

- Dieffenbach (surname)

Places

- Dieffenbach-au-Val (Diefenbach im Tal), Bas-Rhin, France
- Dieffenbach-lès-Wœrth, Bas-Rhin, France

== See also ==
- Diefenbach, Germany
- Diffembach-lès-Hellimer (Diefenbach), Moselle, France
- Diffenbach-lès-Puttelange (Diefenbach), Moselle, France
