= Dieffenbach (surname) =

Dieffenbach is a German surname. Notable people with the surname include:

- Edouard Dieffenbach (1897–1972) French military officer, World War I veteran
- Ernst Dieffenbach (1811–1855), German physician, geologist and naturalist
- Georg Christian Dieffenbach (1822–1901), German poet and theologian
- Johann Friedrich Dieffenbach (1792–1847), German surgeon
- Joseph Dieffenbach (1796–1863), German gardener
- Ty Dieffenbach (born 2005), American football player

== See also ==
- Diefenbach (surname)
