= Edouard Dieffenbach =

French planter and military officer (1897–1976)

Édouard Dieffenbach
- Born: 30 January 1897; Strasbourg, Alsace-Lorraine, German Empire
- Died: 16 July 1976; Antananarivo, Democratic Republic of Madagascar
- Relatives: Edouard Dieffenbach
- Military career
- Allegiance: France
- Unit: Free French Camel Corps
- Conflicts: World War II
- Awards: Knight of the National Order of the Legion of Honor
- Other work: Planter

Édouard Xavier Dieffenbach (30 January 1897 – 16 July 1976) was a French planter and military officer active in the Free French Camel Corps during the Second World War in the theater of East Africa. He was also veteran of the World War I.

== Biography ==
His father, Édouard Dieffenbach, was an accountant in Metz, then German Empire, and his mother was Marie Caroline Koehl, daughter to Louis Xavier Joseph Koehl and Caroline Koehl (nee Gresse). He crossed the front line during the First World War, joining the French Armed Forces. After the war, he settled in Madagascar where he was active as a planter.

At the outbreak of World War II, he was captured by French forces loyal to the Vichy regime in Madagascar, and all his properties were confiscated. Upon release by the British, he made a long journey to the Horn of Africa, where he enrolled with the first Free French Forces in Somaliland in April 1941, a few weeks after the liberation of the territory by British during the East Africa Campaign. There, he principally associated with the 1re DFL/BM21 land forces.

In Djibouti, Captain Edouard Dieffenbach co-founded a squad of meharist camel cavalry, the Free French Camel Corps (French: Corps de méharistes français libres), first known as the Free French Camel Platoon (French: Peloton de méharistes français libres), with an initial strength estimated to about 15-20 camels along with riders of which Dieffenbach was appointed deputy commander. The unit was active from September 1941 to February 1942, fighting notably alongside the British Somaliland Camel Corps and saw action in East Africa.

After the end of the World War II, he returned to Madagascar, and his belongings were returned.

== Distinctions ==
- Knight of the National Order of the Legion of Honor
- Commemorative medal for voluntary service in Free France
