= Tropas Nómadas =

Auxiliary regiment in the Spanish army

Insignia of the Tropas Nómadas

The Tropas Nómadas (Nomad Troops) were an auxiliary regiment to the colonial army in Spanish Sahara (today Western Sahara), from the 1930s until the end of the Spanish presence in the territory in 1975. Composed of Sahrawi tribesmen, the Tropas Nómadas were equipped with small arms and led by Spanish officers, guarding outposts and sometimes conducting patrols on camelback.

== Origins ==
Spain did not permanently maintain any military force in the Sahara until 1926. In that year a locally recruited gendarmerie called the Foot Police Company (Compañia de Policia a Pie) was established and based at Cape Juby. In October 1928 this coastal unit was replaced by the Saharan Police Troops (Tropas de Policia del Sahara) The new and expanded force was partially camel-mounted and operated inland. Roughly half of its personnel were recruited from the Saharan tribes, who were familiar with climate and conditions. The remainder were drawn from Moroccan Regulares and Mehal-la goumiers, seconded from the existing Spanish Army of Africa.

== Establishment ==
First raised in the early 1930s, this force was entitled "Tropas Nómadas del Sahara". It comprised a camel corps, modelled on the French "Meharistes" and serving as desert police. Later the Tropas Nómadas were partially mechanised but camel detachments remained in service until the 1970s. Most officers, and some NCOs and specialists, were Spanish. With expansion and increased mechanism the proportion of Spanish personnel in the Tropas Nomadas increased substantially from the 1960s on, many of them conscripts doing their military service in the Western Sahara.

In total, several thousand Sahrawis were given military training by the Spanish. In 1974, 1,374 Sahrawis were enrolled in the Spanish army (most of them in the Tropas Nómadas), according to Pazzanita & Hodges, out of a population of some 74,000 indigenous inhabitants of the territory, according to a Spanish census taken that same year.

== End of Spanish rule ==
While the Tropas Nómadas gave effective service during the greater part of the force's history, their loyalty was tested by the outbreak of the indigenous Polisario Front's rebellion (1973–75). In May 1975 increasing instances of indiscipline culminated with two mutinies when the Saharan personnel of two motorized desert patrols overwhelmed their Spanish colleagues and took them as prisoners to Algeria.

Following the Spanish Government's decision to hand over the territory to Morocco and Mauritania towards the end of 1975, numbers of the indigenous soldiers deserted. The remainder were disbanded. Many of the former Tropas Nómadas soldiers are believed to have joined Polisario and Spanish-trained fighters formed the core of the Sahrawi People's Liberation Army set up to fight Morocco and Mauritania after the Green March.

== Uniforms ==
The "askaris" of the camel units wore white flowing robes and blue turbans. Other indigenous personnel wore khaki uniforms with blue or khaki turbans.

== Policía Territorial ==
A separate indigenous unit serving the Spanish colonial government was the Policía Territorial. This gendarmerie corresponded to the Civil Guard in metropolitan Spain. It was commanded by Spanish officers and included Spanish personnel of all ranks.

== See also ==
- Harki
- Regulares
- Goumier
