= Sandemar Castle =

Castle in Sweden

- Sweden
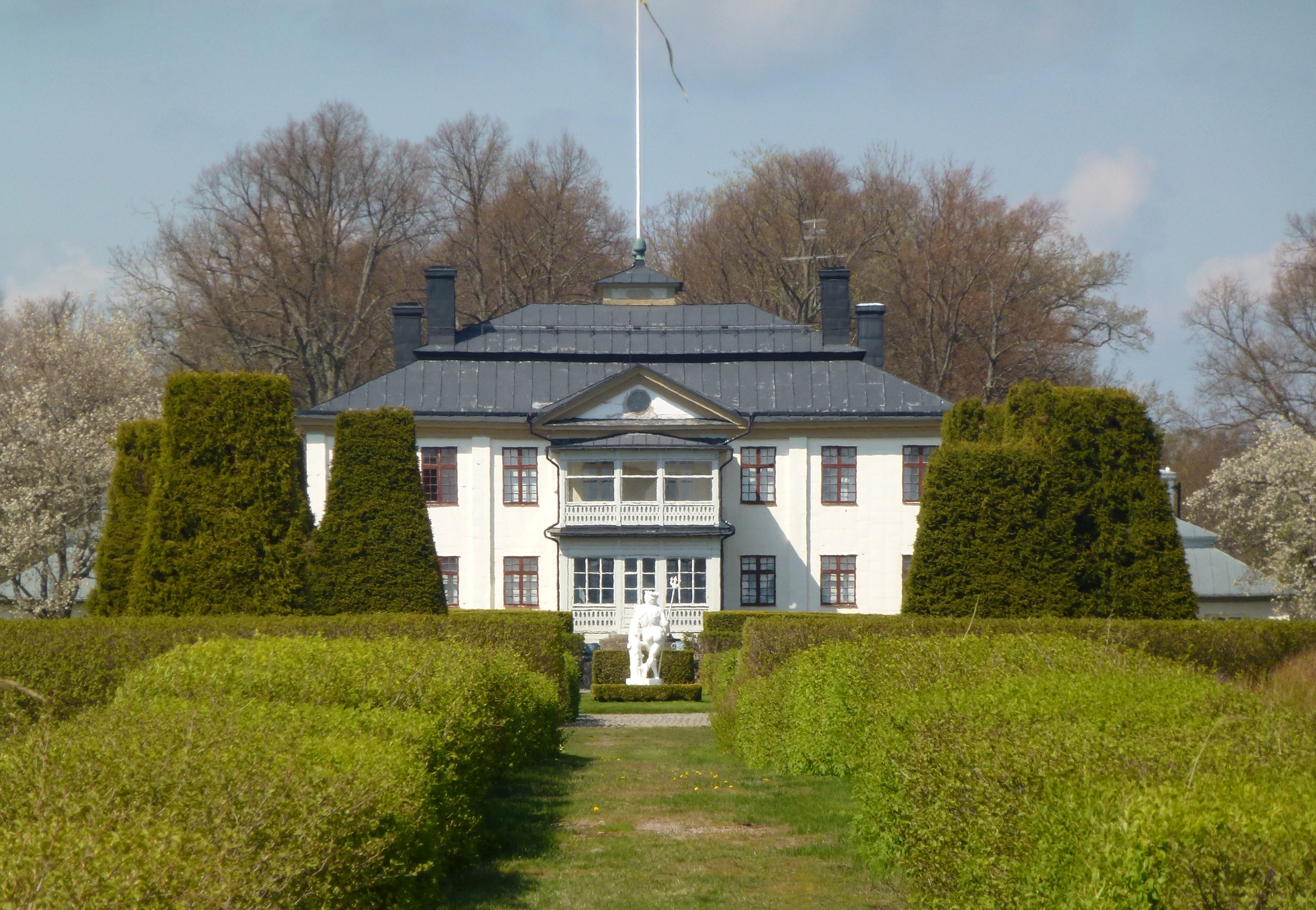

Site information
- Type: Castle

Location
- Coordinates: 59°07′49″N 18°22′05″E

Sandemar Castle is a 17th-century castle in Sweden. It is owned by Karin Mattson Nordin, daughter of the real estate developer John Mattson.

It is located in Sandemar in Österhaninge parish and Haninge municipality on Södertörn. The castle is located on the old route Dalarövägen, about three kilometers west of Dalarö and was built in 1670s. Sandemar is one of the very few Carolingian castles that are well preserved, it still functions as a private residence.

== See also ==
- List of castles in Sweden
