= Gråborg =

- Sweden
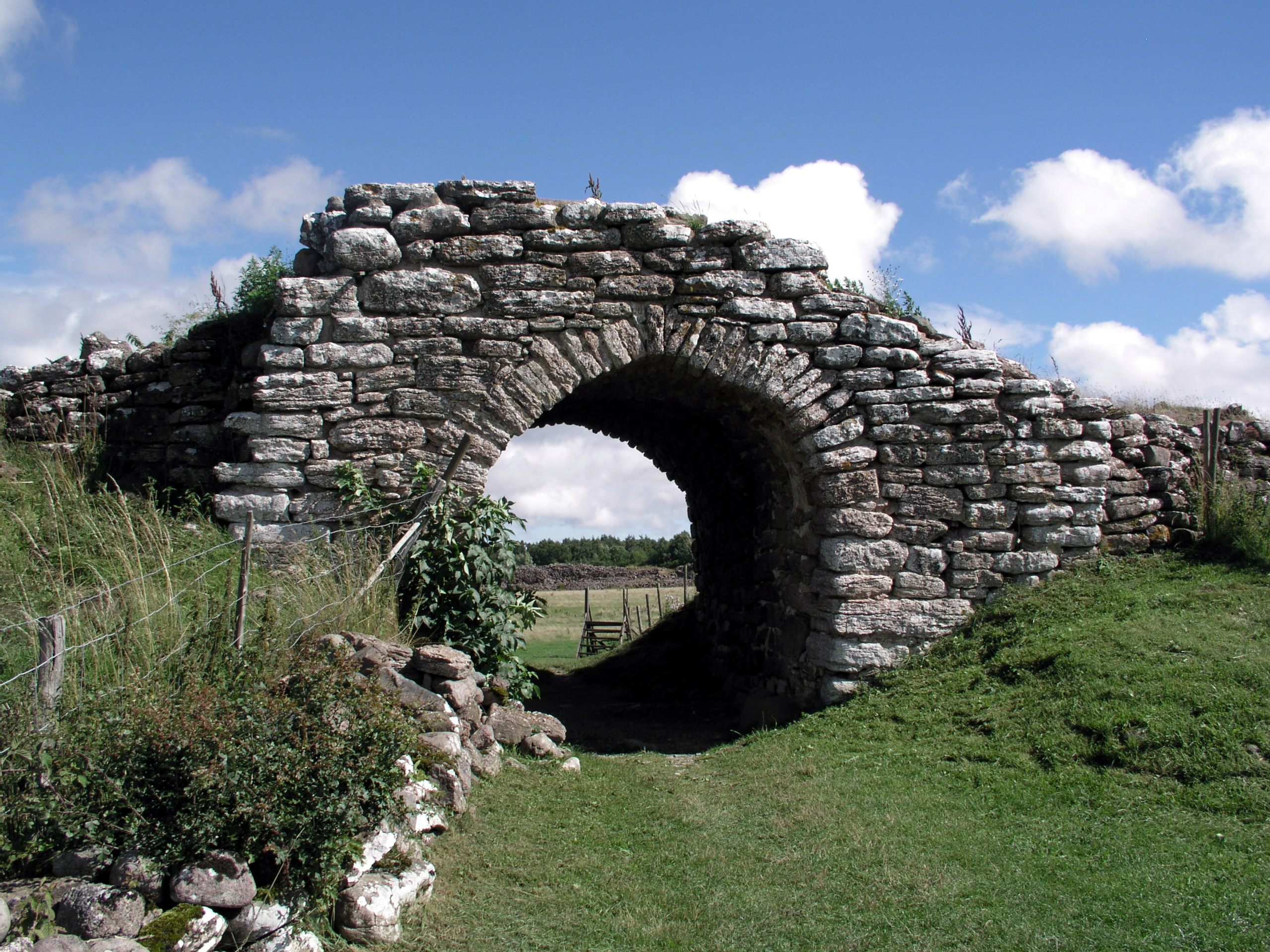
- The entrance to Gråborg

Location
- Coordinates: 56°40′0″N 16°36′12″E

Gråborg is the ruin of a hillfort on Öland, Sweden. It is located in Algutsrum, in Mörbylånga Municipality. The oldest parts of the ancient hillfort are plausible from the 5th century. The hillfort was expanded in stages into the 12th century. During the Middle Ages, Gråborg was probably utilized as a protected marketplace.

Gråborg was for a long time Öland's largest known ancient hillfort. In 2021, Sörby borg was discovered in central Öland, which is larger.

Gråborg consists of a circular rampart, approximately 4 meters (13 foot) high. On the outside, the stones are partly in mortar, which means that the wall has been preserved quite well over time. Gråborg has three openings, one of which has been equipped with a tower superstructure, which was constructed during the Middle Ages. No remains of houses or other buildings have been found inside the hillfort itself due to the land's previous role as agriculture field which destroyed all visible traces of house foundations. However, the size of the hillfort shows that it was a central point in ancient times, perhaps a trading post. Older names of the hillfort are "Backaborg" or "Borg".

Abundant archaeological finds have been made in the hillfort area, which are now kept at the Kalmar County Museum. The oldest parts of the hillfort probably date back to the 6th century. The hillfort reached its current size in the 12th century, after being expanded in stages. The interior of the hillfort is now covered in grass and other vetigation. The hillfort is elliptical in shape and measures approximately 210 by 160 meters.

According to legend, Gråborg is strongly associated with the antiking Burislev Sverkersson, who grew up here with his half-sister Sofia of Minsk.

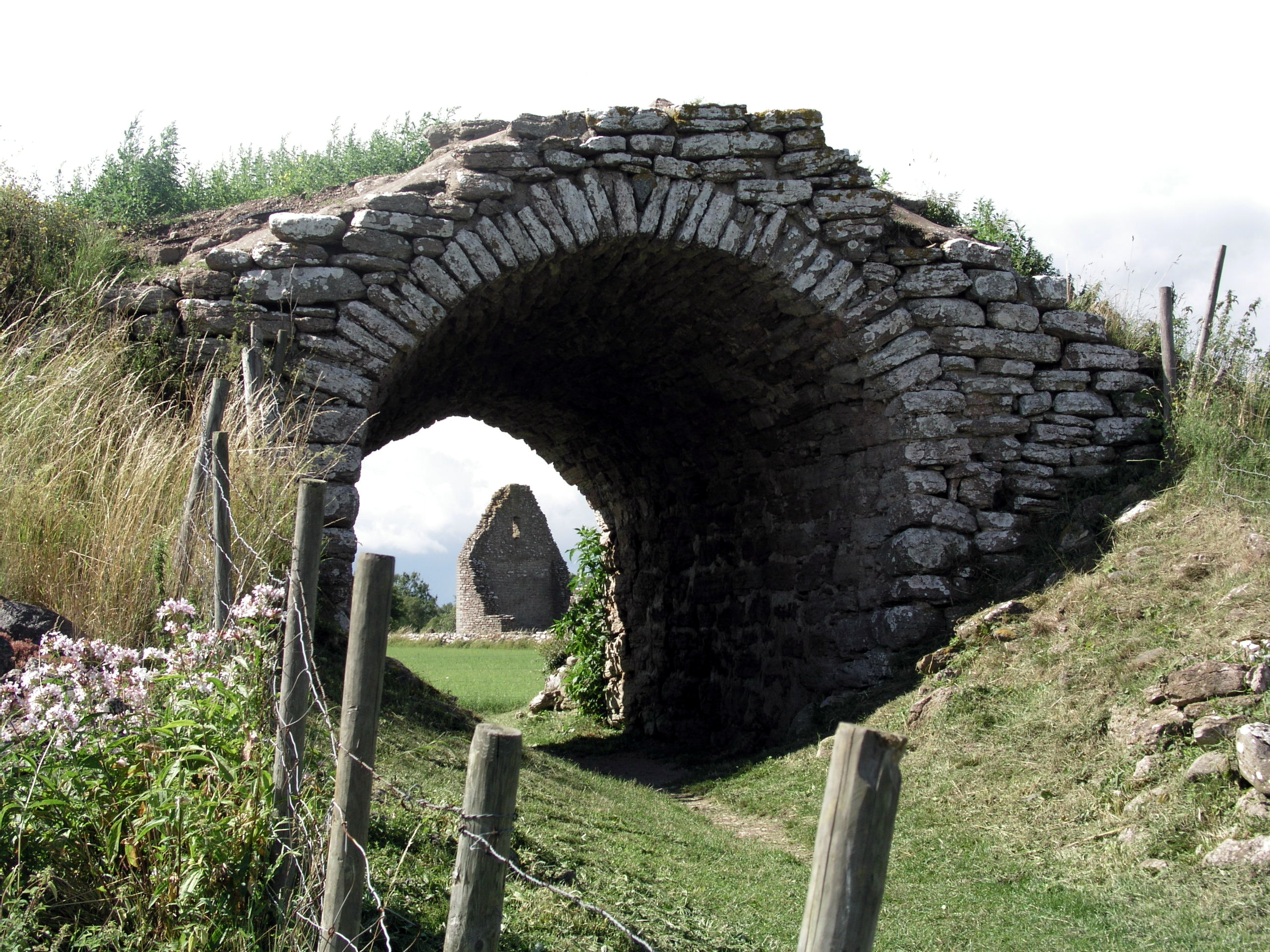

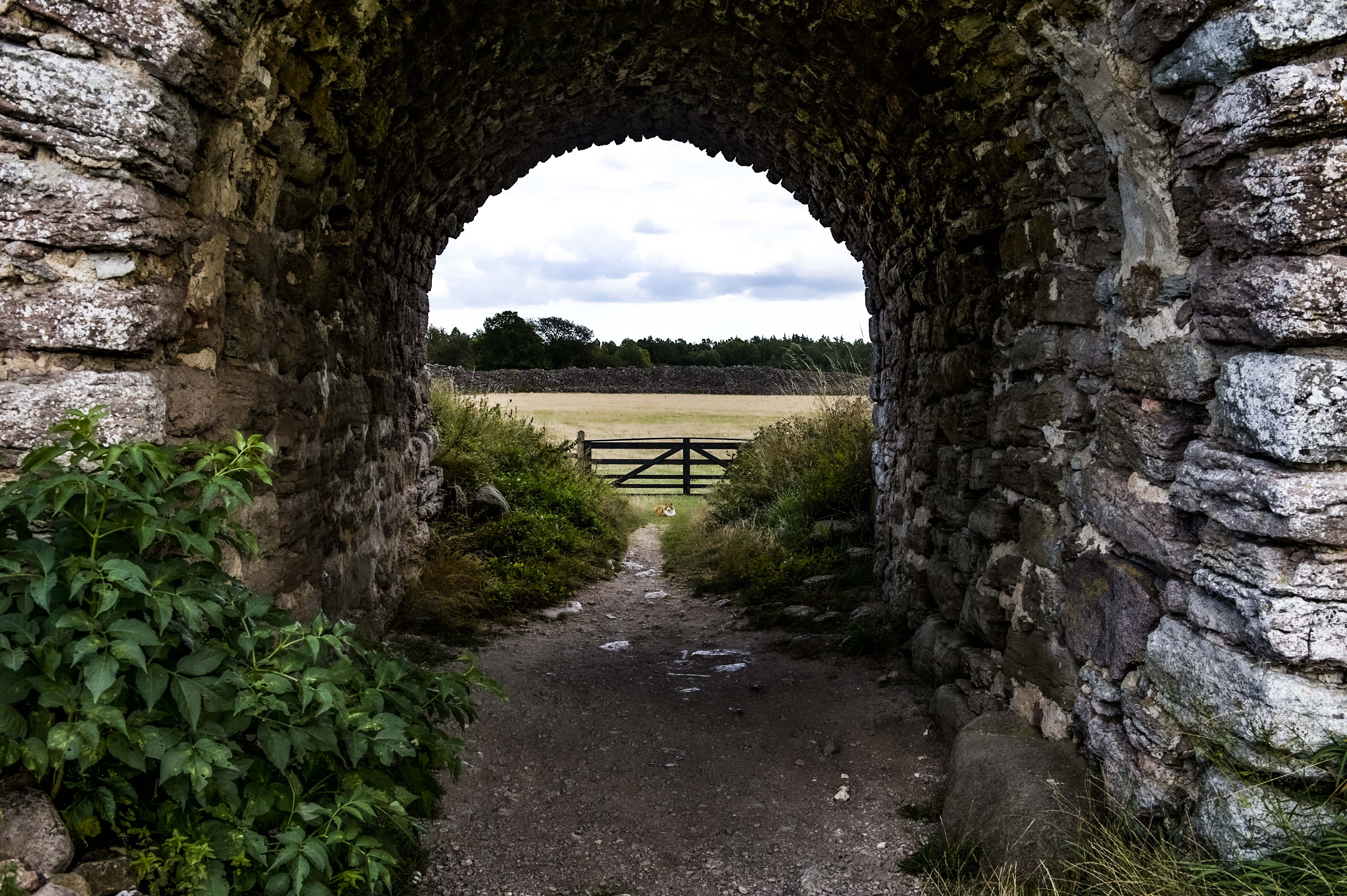

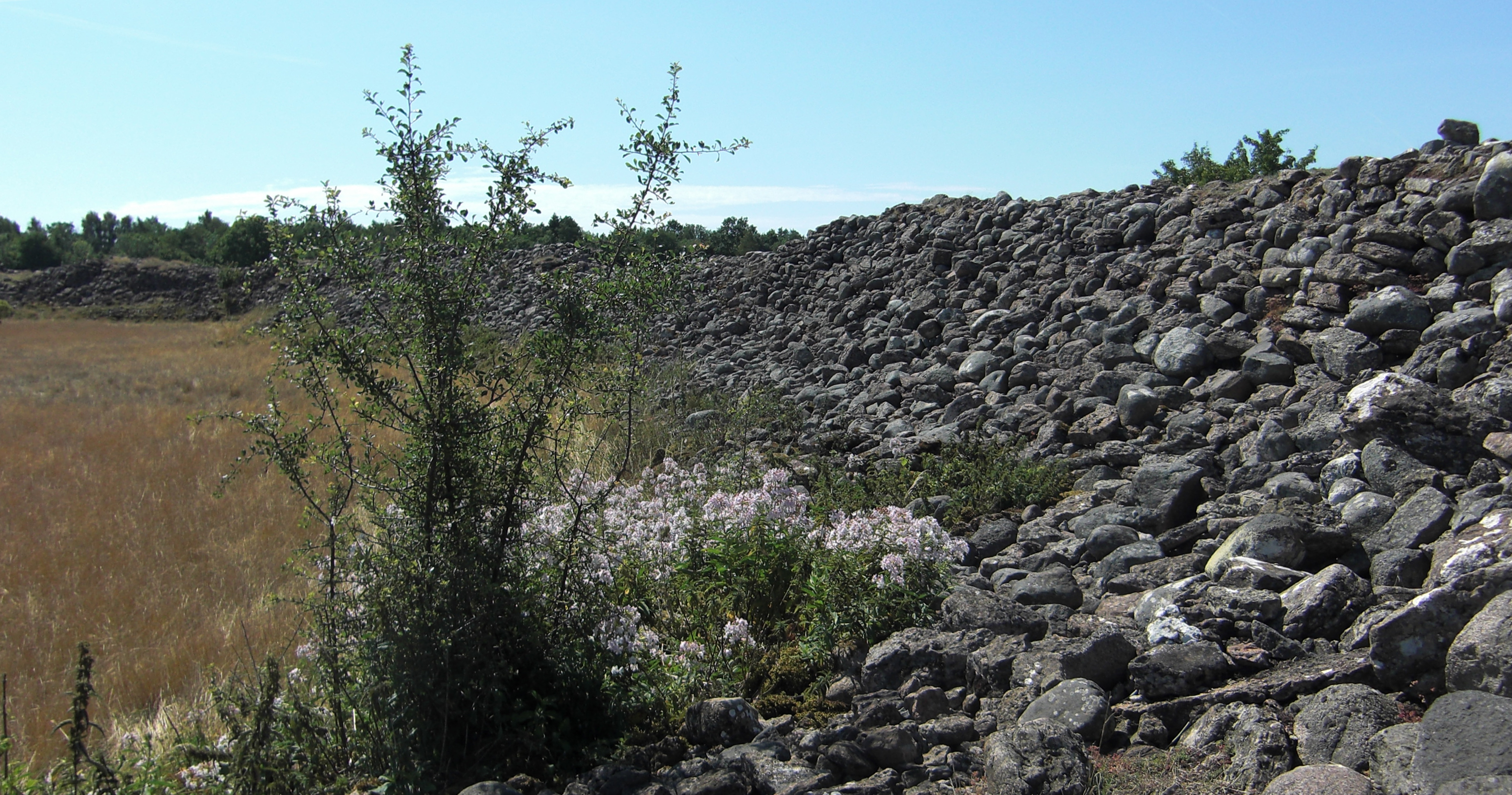

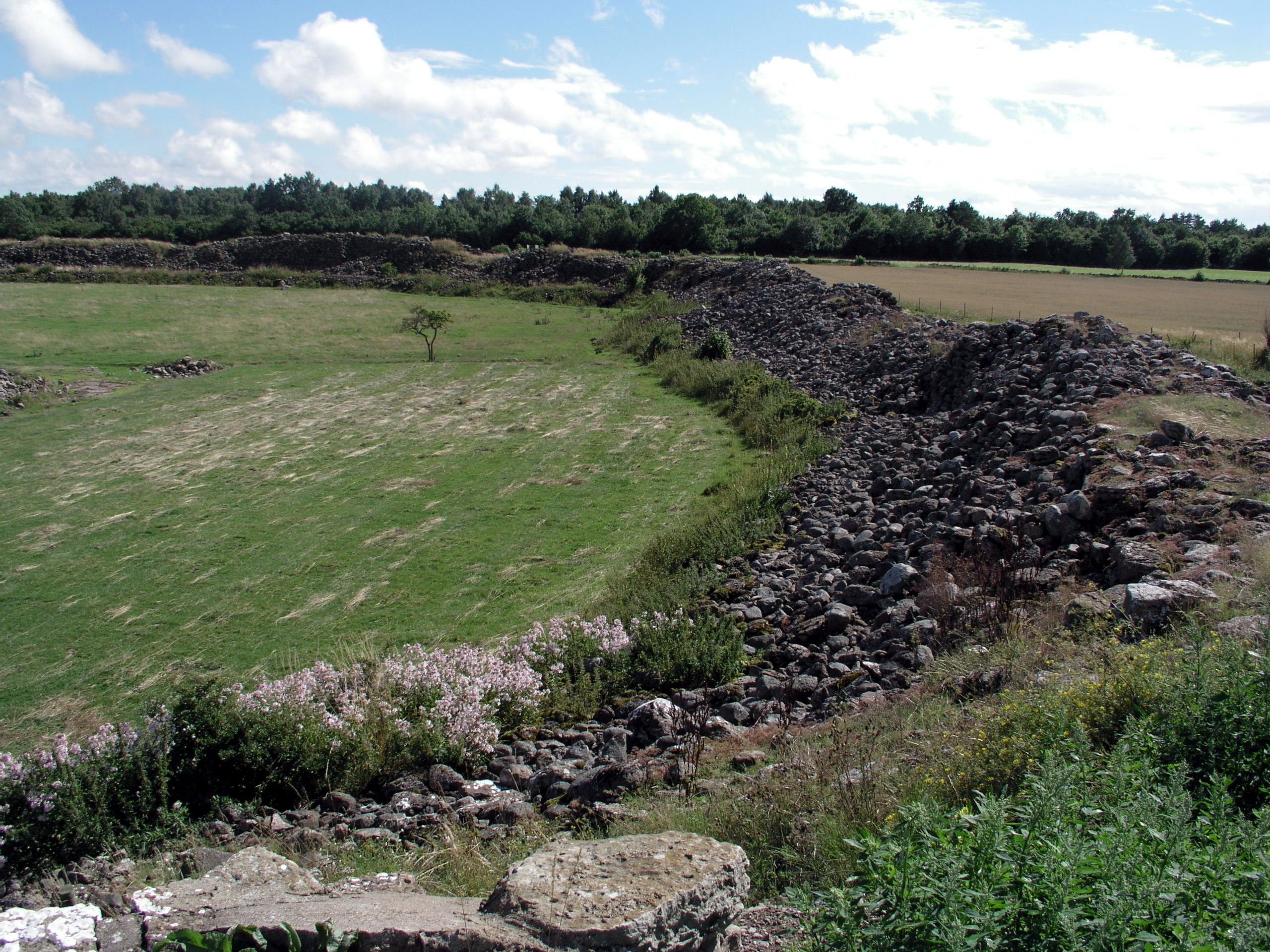

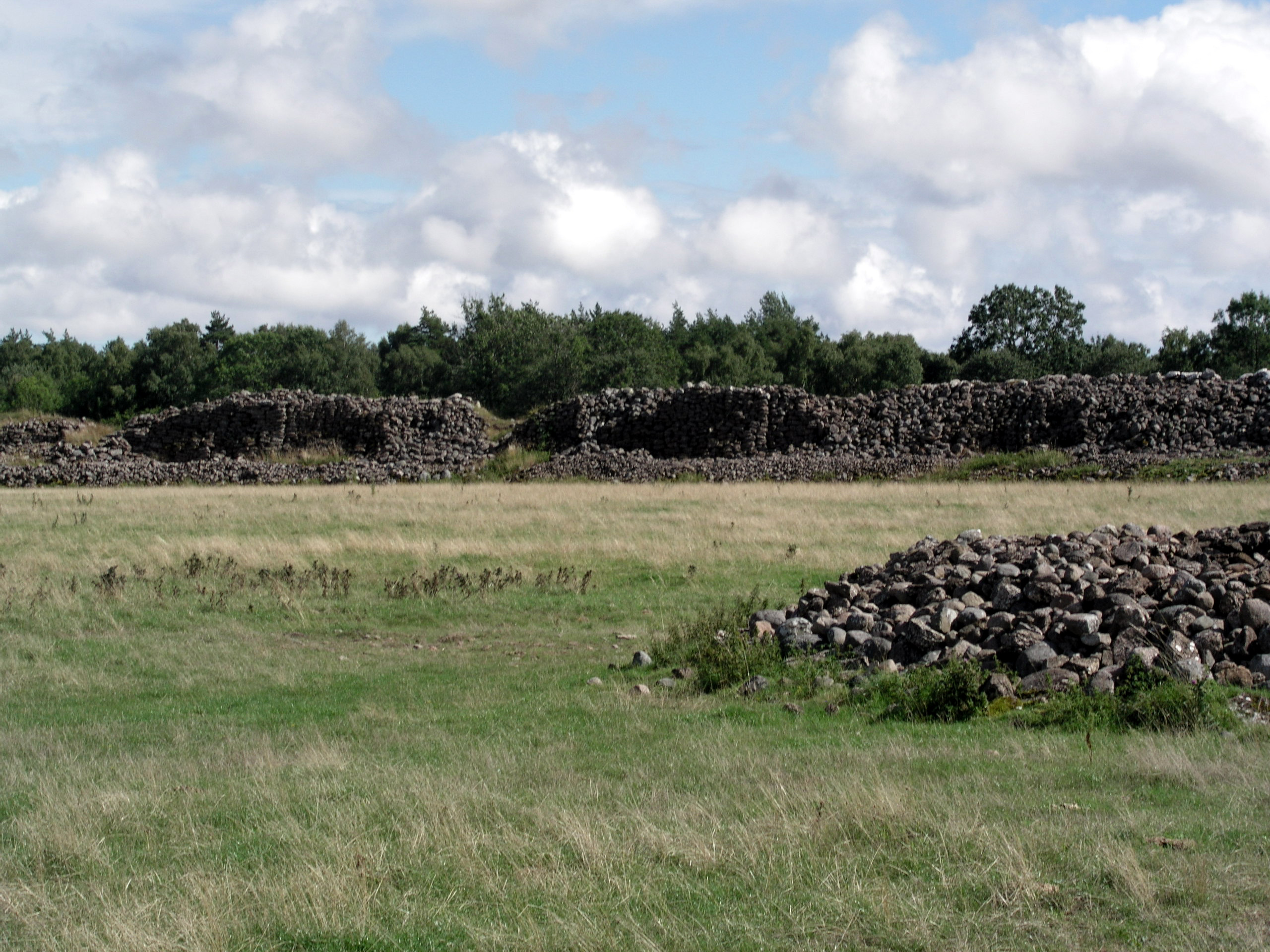

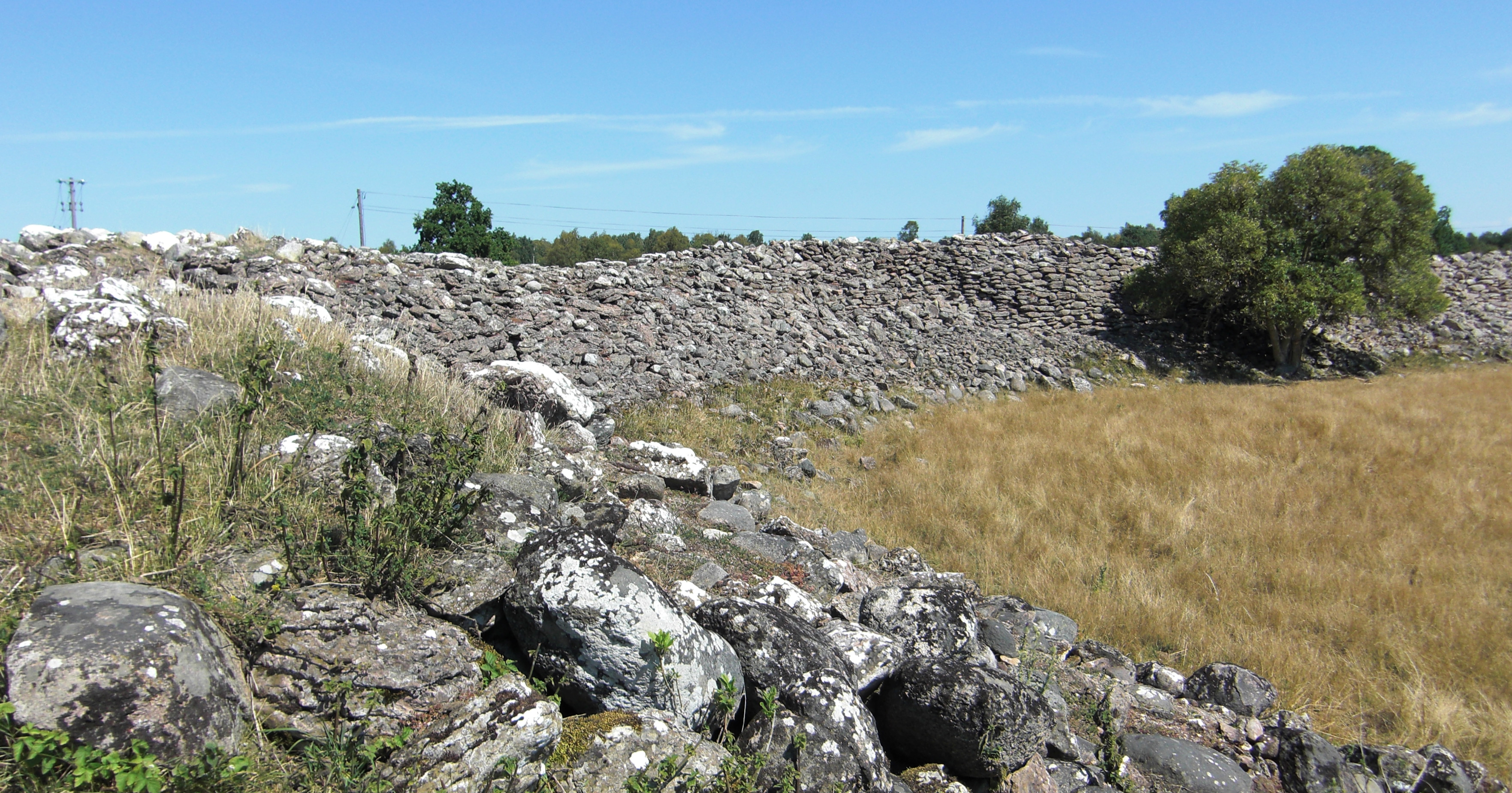

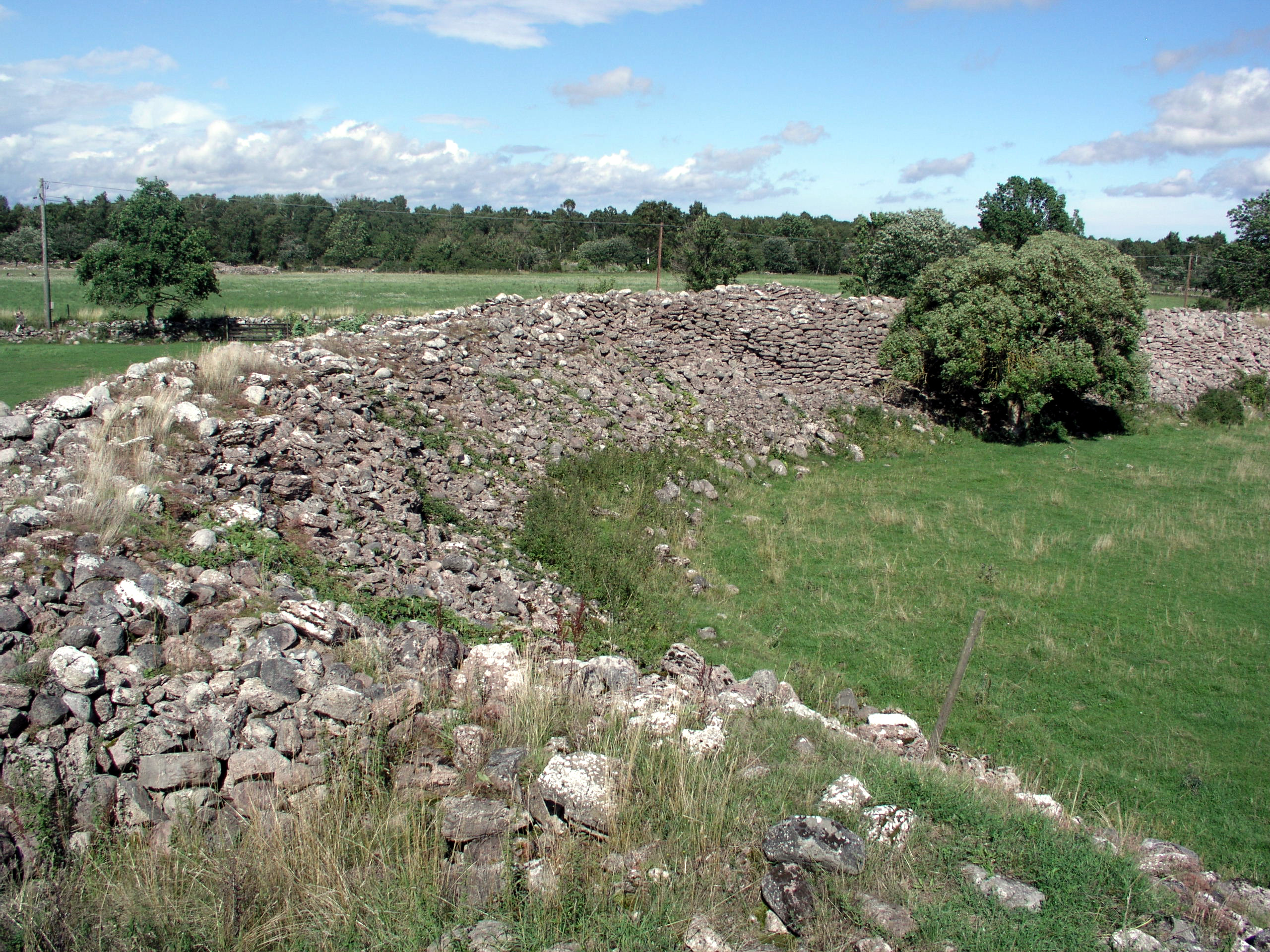

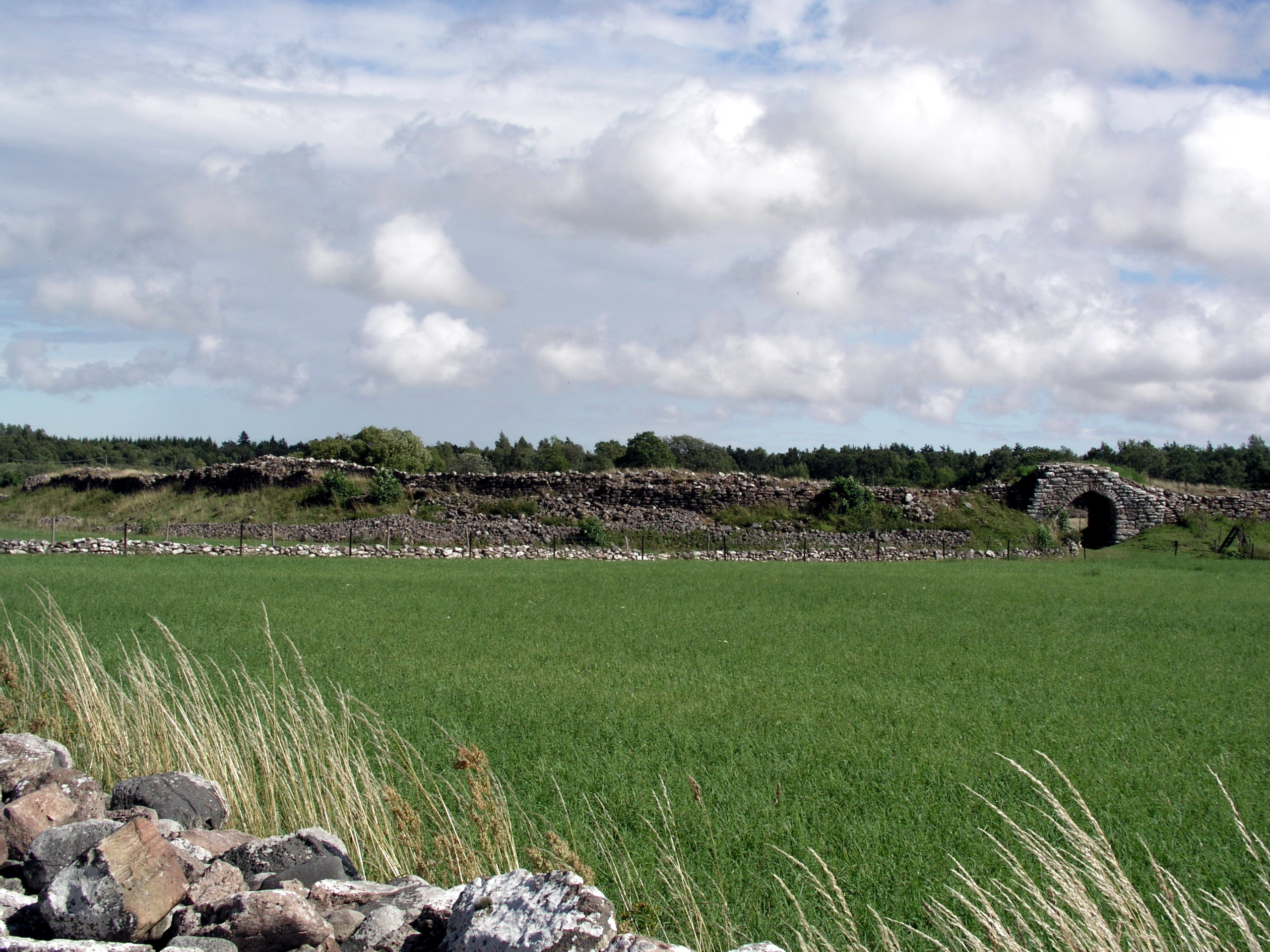

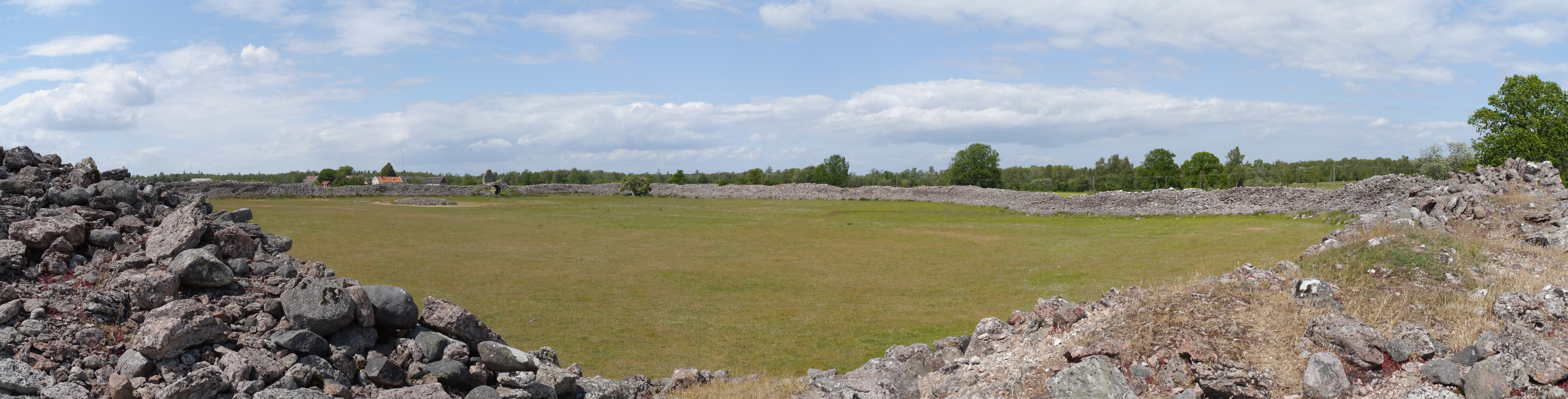

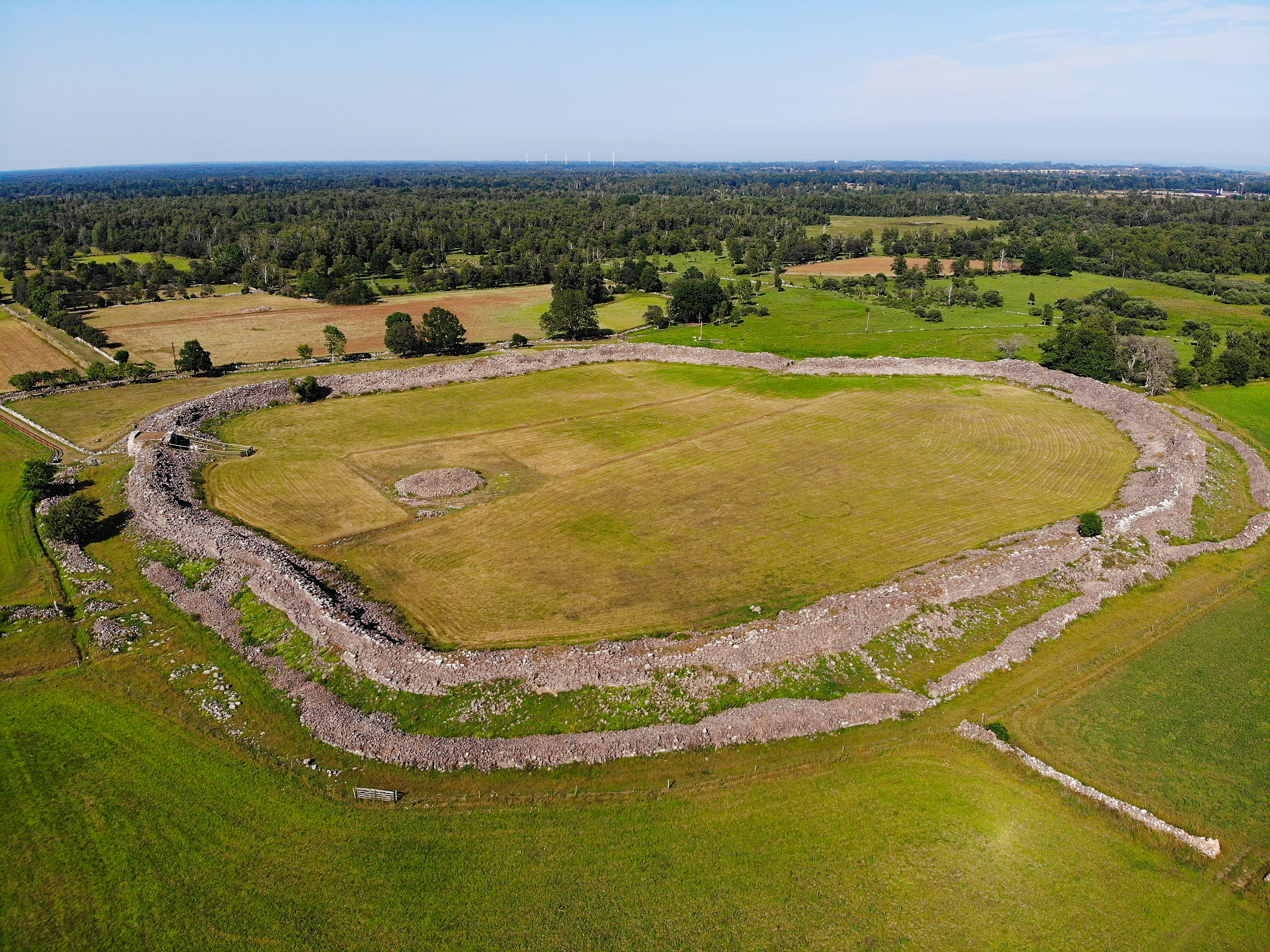

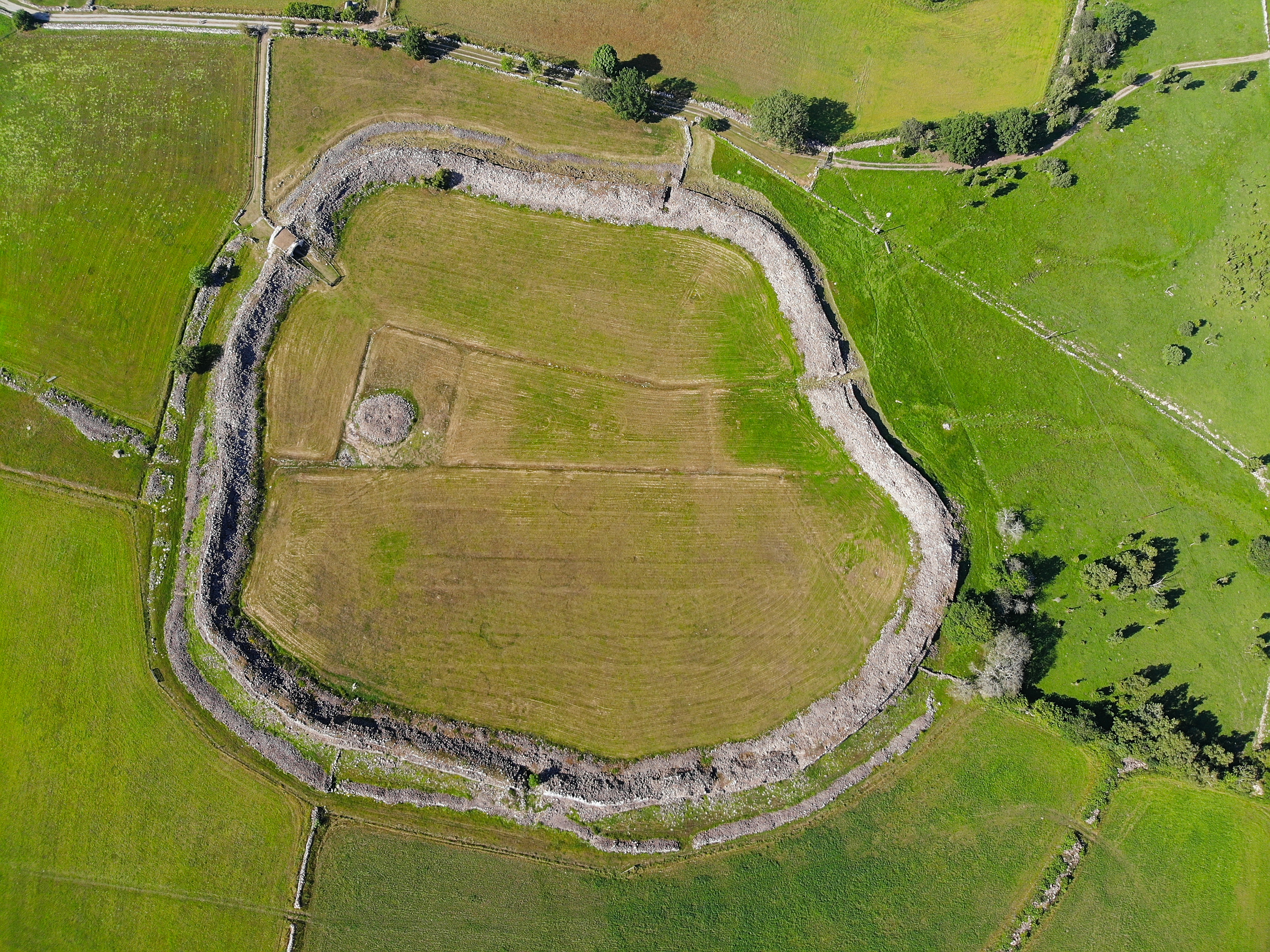

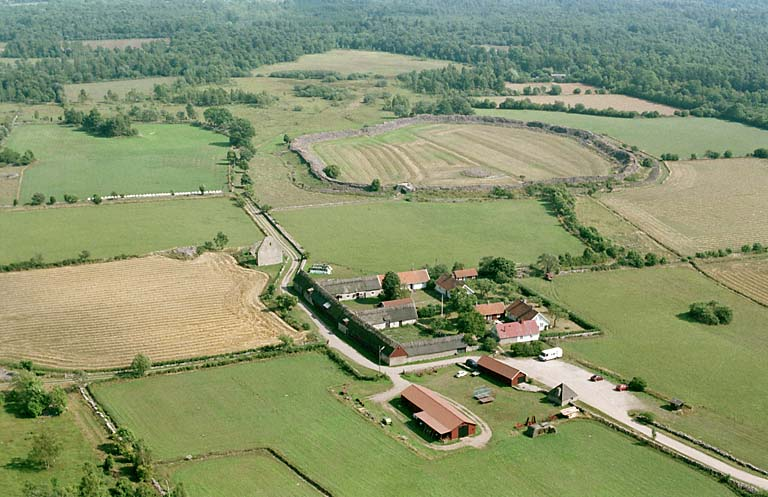

== St. Knut's Chapel ==
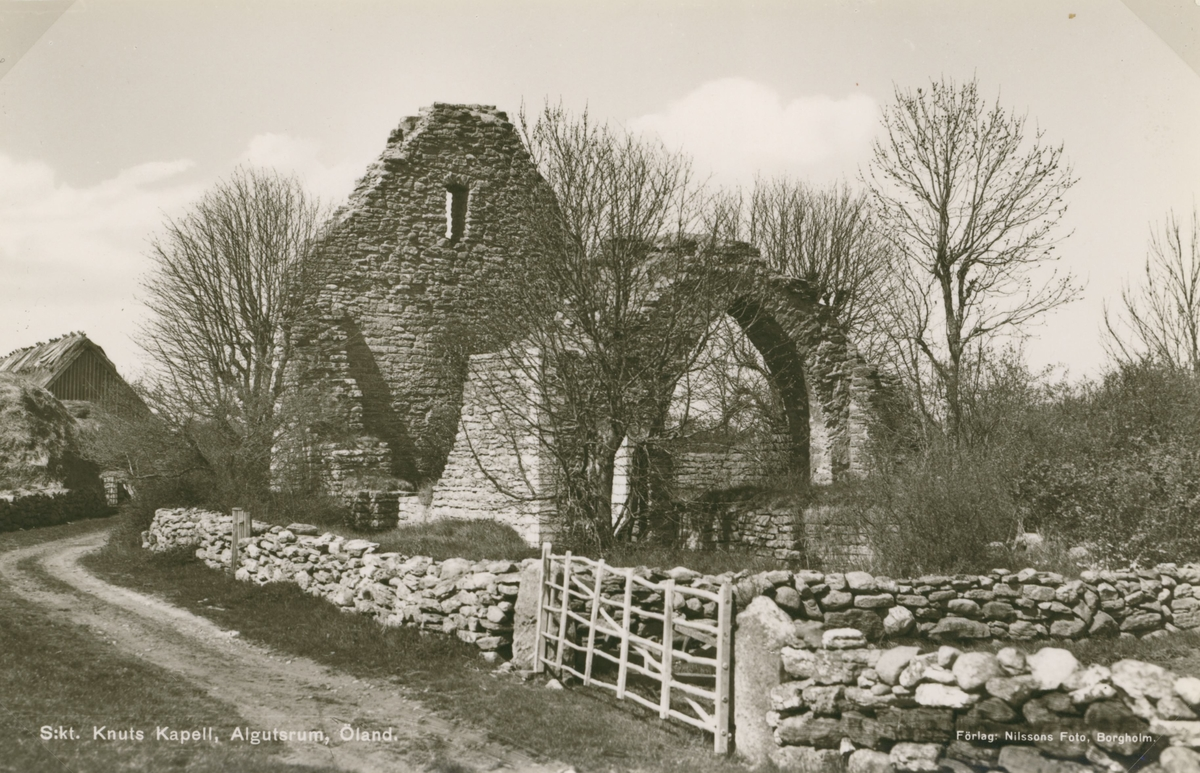
St. Knut's Chapel before restoration

Right next to Gråborg are the ruins of St. Knut's Chapel. The chapel was built in the 12th century and abandoned in the 16th century after the swedish reformation, and its only bell was confiscated to the crown in 1560. Today, only the western gable and the arch remain.

An altarpiece from the chaple can now be found in Algutsrum Church, that is one of the largest on Öland. The altrarpiece is from Northern German and created the year 1475. In the center of the cabinet is the Christ crowned with thorns flanked by Saint Birgitta and sainted king Saint Canute. The left door is decorated with images of Saint Eric and Saint Olaf and the right door with Saint Henry and Saint George.

The chapel building was probably surrounded by a small cemetery; both skeletons and gravestones have been found nearby.

The name comes from the Danish saint king Knut (English: Saint Canute), who was killed in a rebellion in Odense, Denmark in 1086. The name indicates that the place had contacts with Denmark and the Danish Knutsgillen. The nearby village of Borg has been owned by the Royal Academy of Letters since 1945.

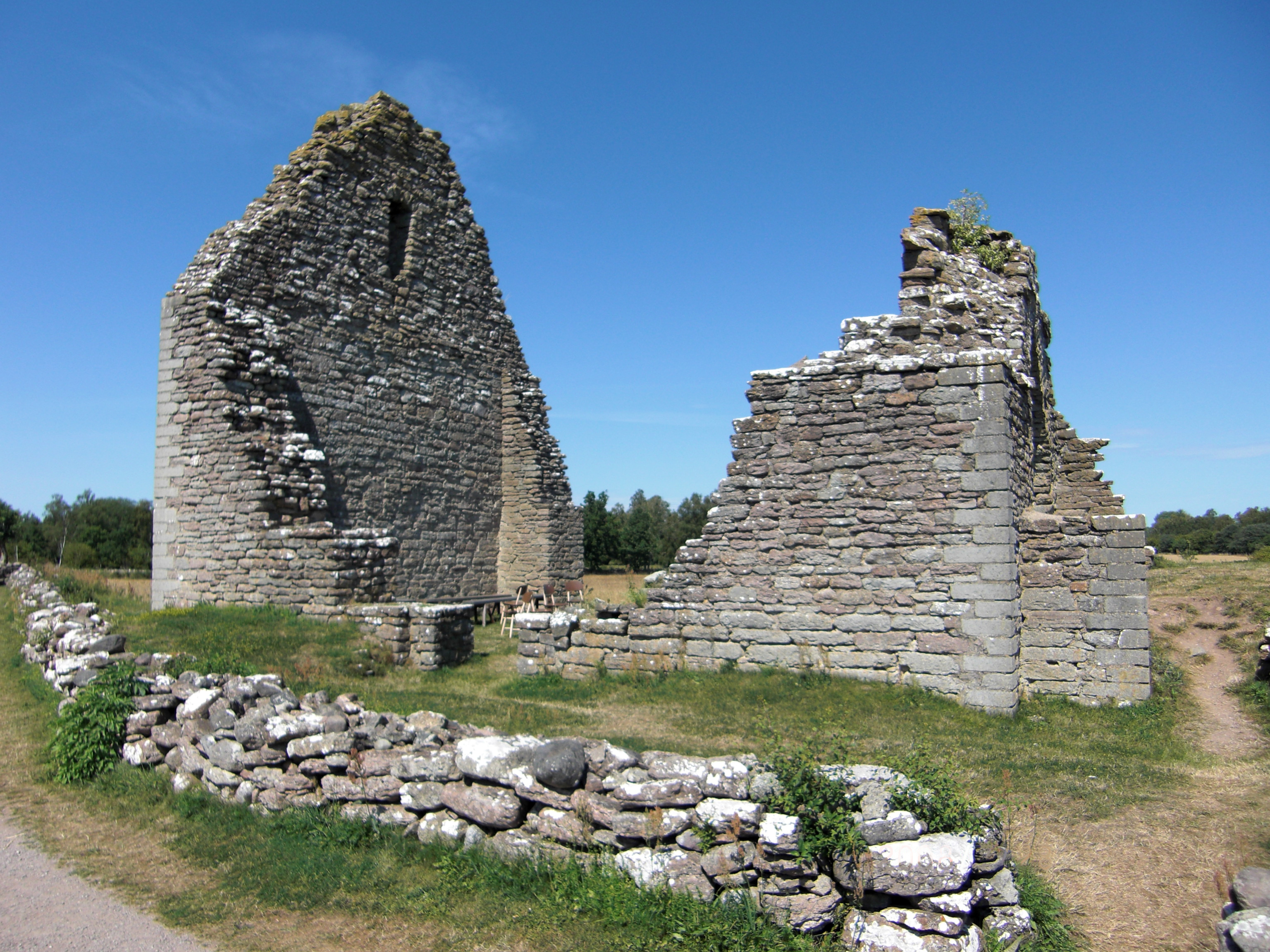

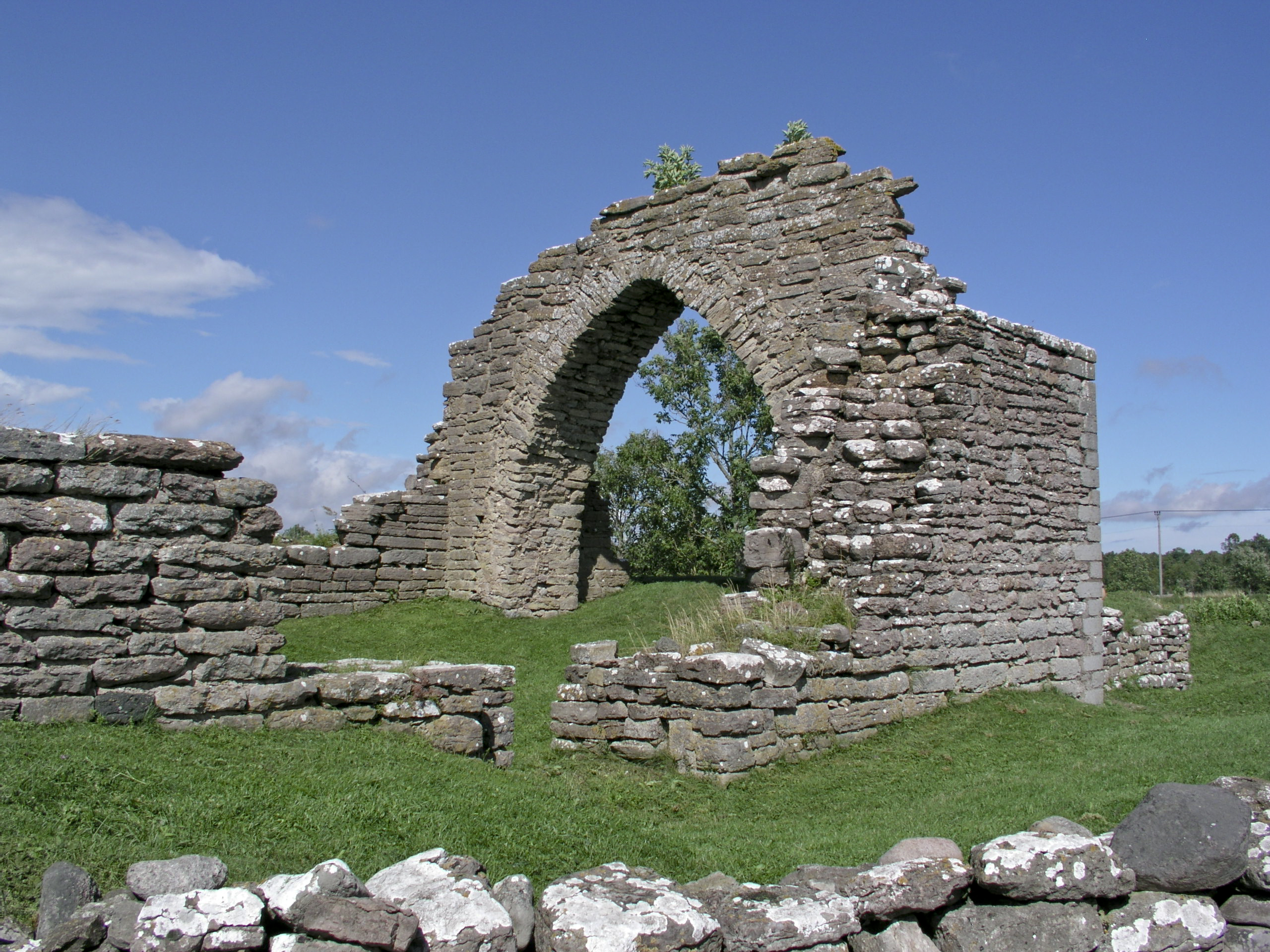

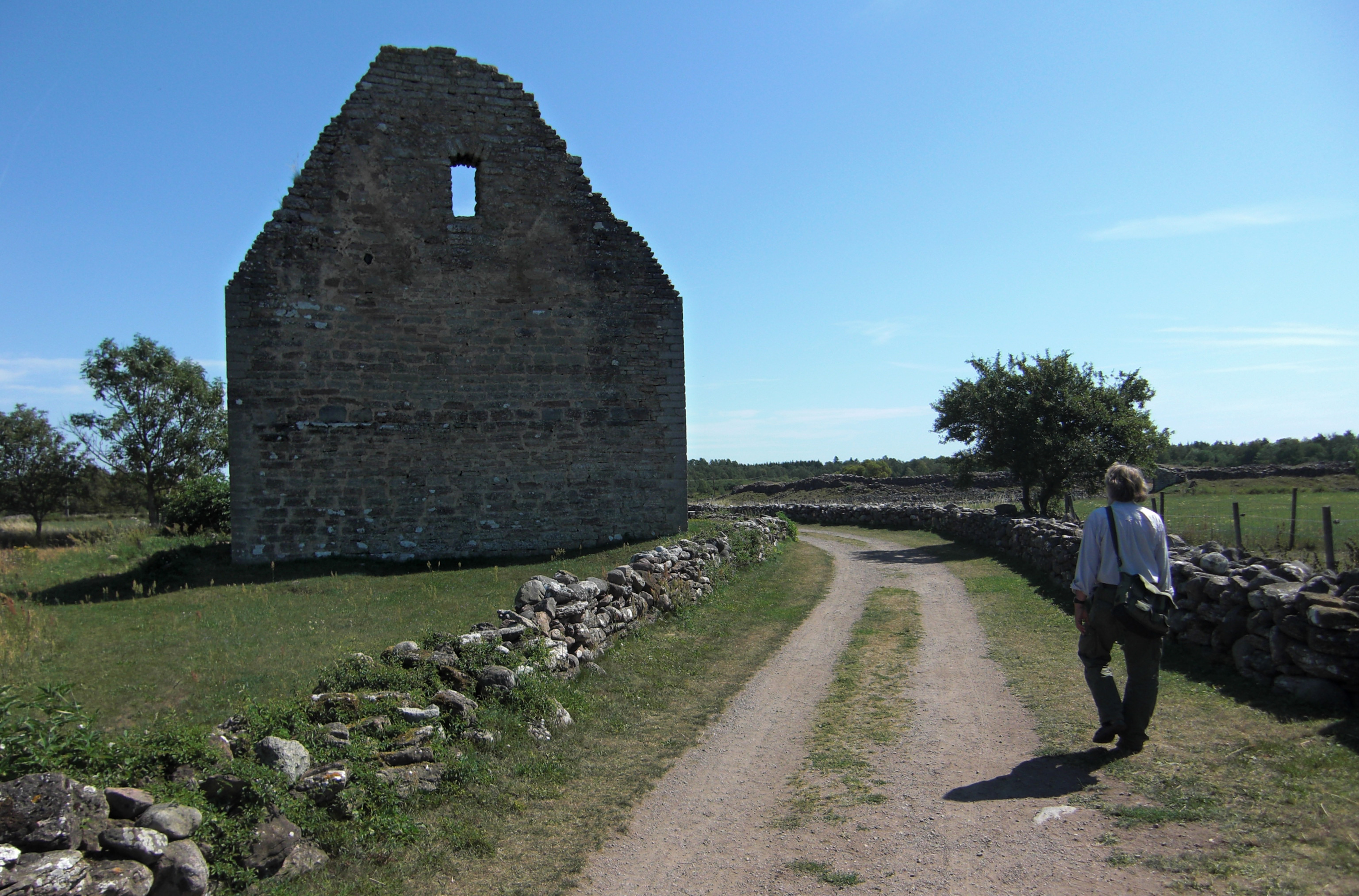

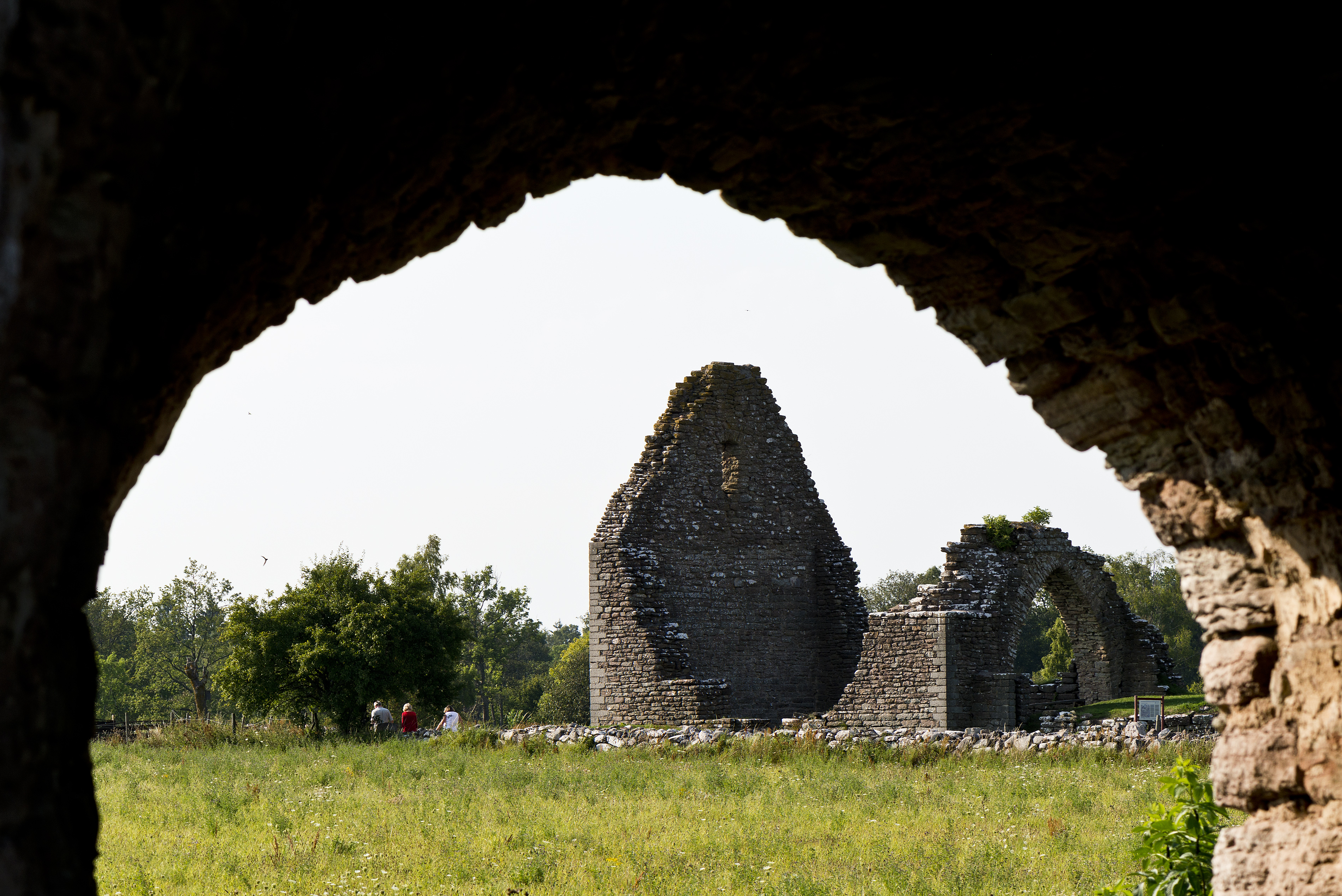

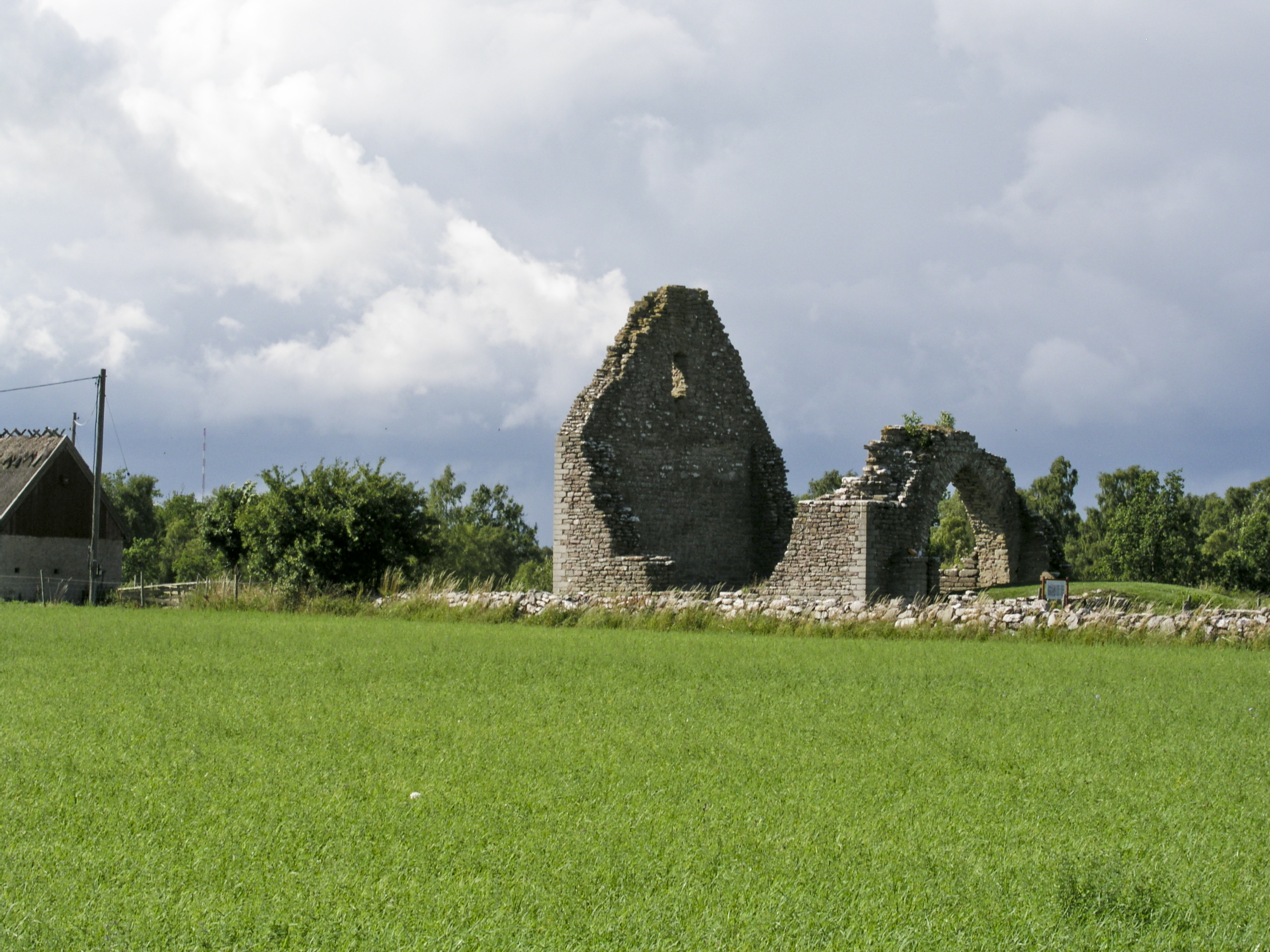

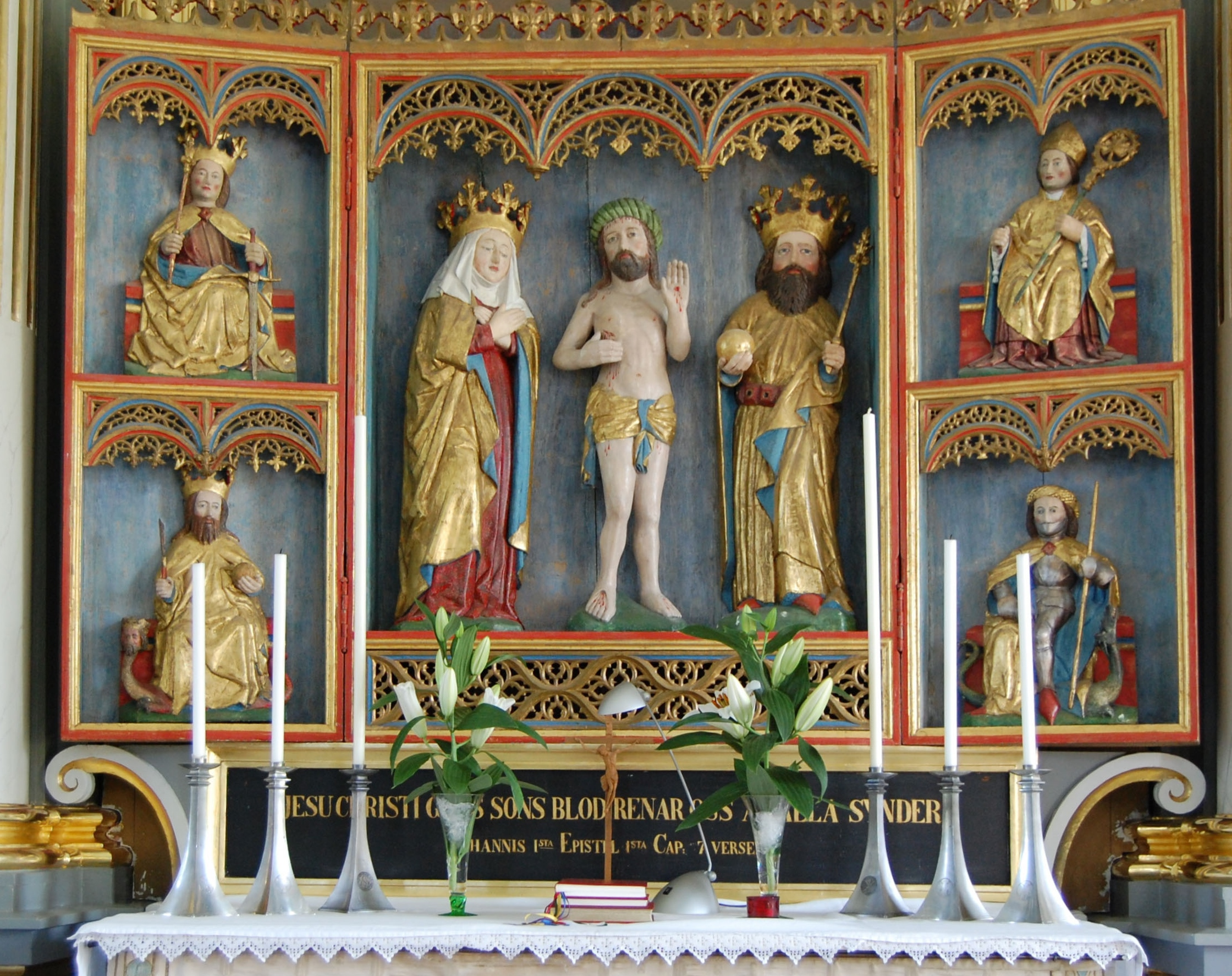

== See also ==
- Öland
- Hillfort
- Reformation in Sweden
- List of castles in Sweden
