= Köksalmanack =

- Country: Sweden
- Language: Swedish
- Genre: almanac-cookbook
- Published: 1933–

Köksalmanack is a Swedish combined almanac-cookbook. Since 1933 it has been published every year.

The earlier title, Husmoderns köksalmanack, was dropped in 1979.
