= Méhariste =

French military camel cavalry

Méhariste is a French word that roughly translates to camel cavalry, originating in the Arabic term for a dromedary. The word is most commonly used as a designation of military units.

== French camel corps ==
=== Origins ===
France created a corps of méhariste camel companies (Compagnies Méharistes Sahariennes), as part of the Armée d'Afrique, in the Sahara in 1902. These units replaced regular units of Algerian spahis and tirailleurs earlier used to patrol the desert boundaries. The newly raised Compagnies méharistes were originally recruited mainly from the Chaamba nomadic tribe and commanded by officers of the French Affaires Indigènes (Native Affairs Bureau). Each company of Méharistes comprised six officers, 36 French non-commissioned officers and troopers, and 300 Chaamba troopers. Their bases were at Tabelbala, Adrar, Ouargla, Fort Polignac (today Illizi) and Tamanrasset.

=== History ===
Meharists during military exercises by French forces in Tunisia, 1931

With their local tribal links, plus their mobility and flexible tactics, the Compagnies Méharistes provided an effective means of policing the desert. A similar camel corps was subsequently raised to cover the southern Sahara, operating from French West Africa and falling within the separate Armée Coloniale. From the 1930s onwards, the Méharistes formed part of the Compagnies Sahariennes which also included motorised French and (from 1940) Foreign Legion units. Following the establishment of a French mandate over Syria in 1920, three méhariste companies were organised in that country as part of the French Army of the Levant.

During World War II méhariste companies, organised as "nomad groups", saw service against Axis forces in the Fezzan and southern Tunisia. At the end of the war the Compagnies Sahariennes resumed their role as desert police. Operating in wide-ranging platoons of 50 to 60 men under French officers, they administered local laws, provided some basic medical assistance, inspected wells and reported on the state of pastures in the fertile oasis areas.

The Sahara remained relatively quiet during the Algerian War of Independence (1954–62) but there was one instance, on 17 October 1957, where 60 méharistes of the Adrar camel company near Timimoun mutinied and killed their eight French officers and N.C.Os. Joining with elements of the ALN the meharistes subsequently ambushed a French petrol convoy. The 3rd Regiment of Colonial Paratroops, under its commander Colonel Bigeard, was then dispatched to the Sahara to destroy the mutineers in clashes between November and December 1957.

During the later stages of the Algerian War, méhariste detachments did patrol the southern (Saharan) ends of the fortified Morice Line along the Tunisian border. On several occasions the ALN attempted to outflank the line by disguising commando units as méharistes.

The camel-mounted units were retained in service until the end of French rule in 1962. The locally recruited méharistes (numbering about 162 in each company or goum at this date) were then disbanded while French personnel (16 per company) were transferred to other units.

=== Post-independence ===
The modern Algerian army maintains up to twelve companies of desert troops in the Sahara but these are mechanized units. A small camel mounted corps with Tuareg personnel, modelled on the méharistes of the French era, was disbanded c.1980.

In 1996 the government of Mali re-established a camel corps of six companies for patrol and policing work along its Saharan border. However, the Tuareg rising of 2012 and subsequent disturbances led to widespread losses and desertions amongst the méharistes. As of 2013 only 368 méharistes remained in service and the future of the corps was in doubt. Mauritania retains a méhariste unit for at least ceremonial purposes.

=== Uniform ===
The Compagnies Méharistes wore flowing coats (gandourah) of either white for Arab or blue for Tuareg troopers, with turbans, veils and wide black trousers (seroual). Two red sashes were worn – one wound around the waist and the other crossed on the chest under red-brown leather equipment of traditional Saharean pattern. A khaki field dress of similar cut was also worn.

French personnel wore light-blue kepis. All ranks were normally bare-footed when in the saddle, in order not to harm the sensitive upper body of their camels. The saddlery and other leather equipment was of local design and often elaborately decorated.

== Italian camel corps ==
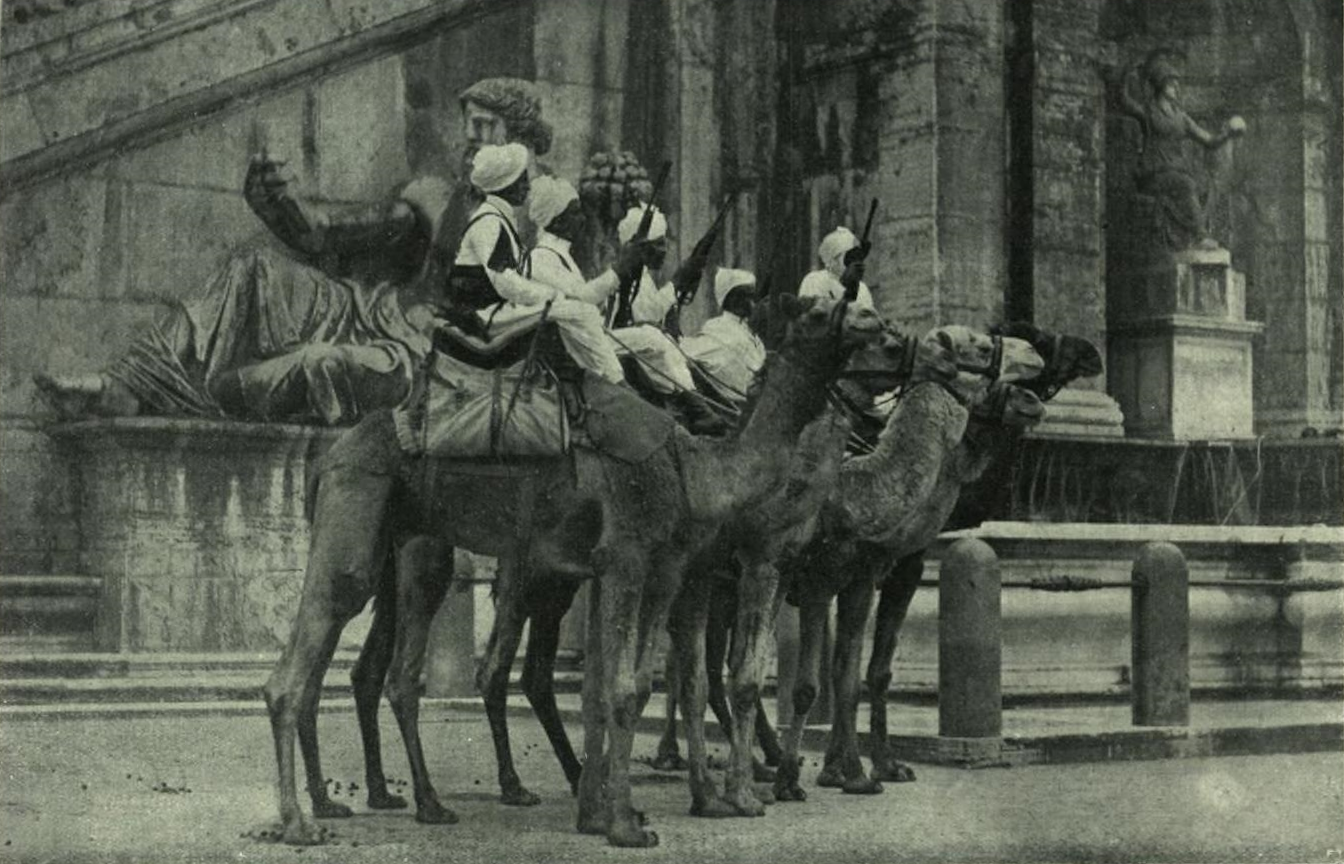
Italian camel cavalry in Rome, 1926

Locally recruited camel corps, named Meharisti, were maintained by the Royal Corps of Colonial Troops in the Italian North African territories of Cyrenaica and Tripolitania during the colonial period. The Italian Zaptie meharista served primarily as desert gendarmerie. Like their French and Spanish counterparts they were recruited from the indigenous desert tribes, and wore modified versions of tribal dress.

== Spanish camel corps ==
Locally recruited camel corps were maintained by the Spanish army in its North African colonial territory, the Spanish Sahara. These Tropas Nómadas served primarily as desert gendarmerie. Like their French counterparts, they were recruited from the indigenous desert tribes and wore modified versions of tribal dress.

== See also ==
- Tirailleurs – Colonial infantry used in the French Army.
- Saharan Companies of the French Foreign Legion
- French colonial flags
- French Colonial Empire
- List of French possessions and colonies
- Citroën Méhari
- Royal Corps of Colonial Troops in the Italian Army

== Sources ==
- (in French) The Méhariste
- "L'Armee D'Afrique 1830-1962" C.R. Hure 1977
- "The Conquest of the Sahara" Douglas Porch ISBN 0-394-53086-1
- "Le Uniformi Coloniali Libiche 1912-1942" Piero Crociani. La Roccia 1980
- "Uniformes Militares de la Guerra Civil Espanola" Jose Bueno. Libreria Editorial San Martin Madrid 1971
