= Stockholm during the Age of Liberty =

Historical time period in Stockholm

The renewal of the Riddarhustorget square, during the Age of Liberty still a vital and central location, was symptomatic for the era's passion for embellished public squares.

Stockholm during the Age of Liberty (1718-1772) is the period in the history of Stockholm when Sweden was governed by weak kings and a strong Riksdag where the Hats and Caps were fighting each other for influence. The Age of Grand Power ended with Great Northern War, the death of Charles XII, the Stockholm treaties of 1719 and 1720.

During 1720–1850 Stockholm was a city in stagnation. Financial resources were during this period being transposed from countryside to cities, which benefited rural areas dominated by free-holding peasants. The Mälaren region, with its many large mansions, lost in influence to the benefit of western Sweden. Welfare dwindled in Stockholm, and more so among the wealthy, which caused social classes to approach each other.

== Urban development ==
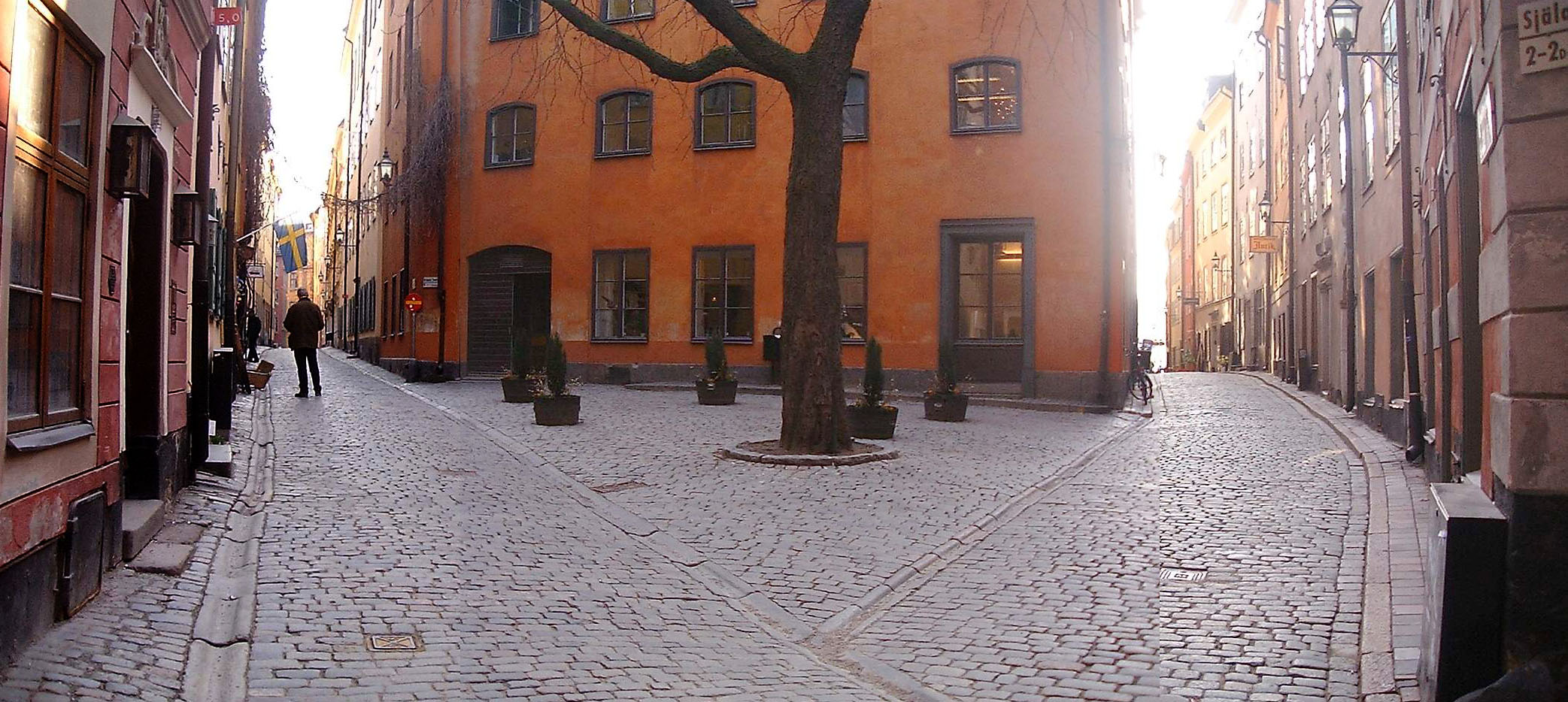
During the era, several small spaces were created in the old town to allow horse-drawn vehicles to turn, including Brända Tomten (depicted), Gåstorget, and Sven Vintappares Torg.

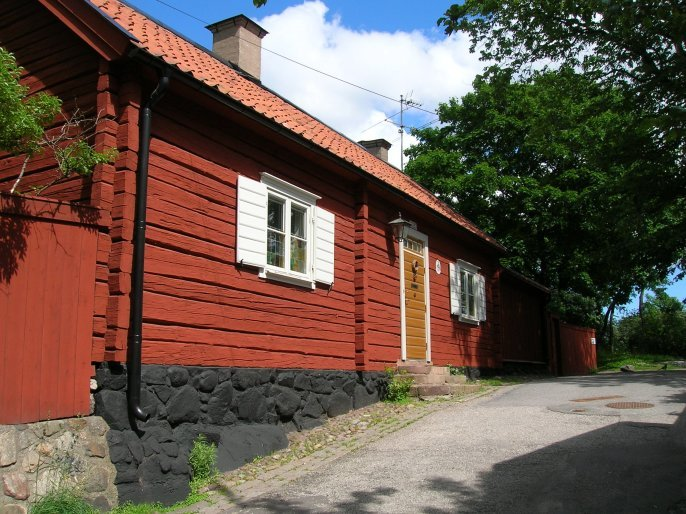
One of the still intact 18th century buildings on Södermalm.

In 1723 a devastating fire destroyed large parts of the parish of the Catherine Church, an event which resulted in the city's first building code in 1725. Produced by City Architect G J Adelcrantz (1668–1739), the assistant of Nicodemus Tessin the Younger, it attempted to improve fire safety by prohibiting wooden buildings in the old town, and ameliorate the city's appearance by implementing the rectangular 17th century city plan.

The royal palace had been ruined by fire in 1697, but as the king lost in influence during the Age of Liberty, the work on the new palace was postponed until 1727. Under the leadership of Carl Hårleman (1700-1753) and Tessin the Younger's son Carl Gustaf Tessin, a group of skilled artists and craftsmen from both Sweden and elsewhere gathered around the royal construction work and the newly founded Academy of Arts which was to be of tremendous importance for the visual arts and architecture during the century that followed.

In 1727, J E Carlberg (1683–1773) was appointed new city architect — a position which he was to hold for almost 50 years, a period marked by dwindling resources and growing needs. As an architect, Carlberg was industrious and designed structures of all sizes all over town, few of which were ever built and considerably less have survived. His most notable surviving deed is the present Baroque exterior of the Storkyrkan church, a product of the reconstruction 1736-42 which amalgamated the appearance of the medieval church with that of the new palace.

As a city planner, Carlberg reworked the building code at several occasions which resulted in wooden buildings being prohibited on the ridges surrounding the medieval city. Notwithstanding these precautions, two devastating fires in the 1750s destroyed large parts of the buildings on the ridges. Some of the structures built following these fires are today, together with Djurgårdsstaden, the best preserved 18th century neighbourhoods in Stockholm. To the straight boulevards proposed by his predecessors, Carlberg added new squares and open spaces surrounded by uniformly designed façades with colours limited to various shades of yellow and grey — still a characteristic of large parts of Stockholm. One of Carlberg's adepts was Erik Palmstedt (1741–1803). Palmstedt was able implemented many of the renewal plans Carlberg have had for the medieval city, including the Stock Exchange Building and the small open space Tyska Brunnsplan, both still preserved. In 1744–53, the area around the Karl Johanslussen sluice was redesigned by an aged Christopher Polhem (1661–1751).

== Population ==
Population
Late 17th century	55-66.000
Around 1720	45.000
Mid 18th century	60.000
Mid 19th century	90.000

Following the Treaty of Nystad in 1722, Sweden's roll as a major European power was over, and the decades that followed brought even further disaster; Black death and the sufferings caused by the Great Northern Wars made Stockholm the capital of a shrinking nation, a despair which would deepen even further as Sweden lost Finland in 1809. Notwithstanding Sweden managed to recover with the union with Norway in 1814, during the period 1750–1850 Stockholm was a city in despair with a dwindling population, widespread unemployment, marked by ill-health, poverty, alcoholism, and ramping mortality. While population in Stockholm grew from 60.000 to 90.000 during the period 1750-1850, most of this growth occurred after 1810, and other major cities in southern and western Sweden grew more rapidly, why Stockholm lost much of its hegemony while remaining the largest Swedish city.

There was a surplus of women during the period, not exclusively in Stockholm but more pronounced there, much due to wars and alcohol abuse. A side effect of this was widows outnumbering widowers 6:1 in 1850; and the number of unmarried people increased (not only in Stockholm but in Swedish cities overall.) Falling short of the social security a marriage meant at this time, infant mortality was severe, and as most people who moved into the city were adults, there were few children. average length of life was 44 (compared to 70 today), which mostly reflects the high infant mortality. People who managed to survive infancy were likely to get about as old as people do today, especially if they had the luck to be able to avoid hard labour.

=== Average household ===
The average household was composed of 3,5 individuals, which is very low both in international and national contexts (rural Sweden=4). However, these figures are based on the contemporary notion of a household which excluded children over 16 as they were liable to taxation. With all individuals living together included, households in Stockholm virtually corresponded to those in other Swedish cities. There were local differences as well, with the poorest areas of Södermalm having an average of 5 individuals per household. With a shortage of men, at least 30–40 per cent of household were led by women during the first half of the 19th century. However, in the Katarina district on Södermalm, approximately 70 per cent of households were led by women in 1810, which reflects women there being in majority and older than average. In the wealthier central city districts it was uncommon with women as head of household. In today's old town, an average household included grandparents, a maid or a journeyman, and often a relative — in all 3–4 adults and 1 child; often with a surplus of men. From the mid 19th century, a modernization of employment contracts caused journeymen to set up their own households and throughout the century the number of household including lodgers increased from one to two third, much because of a housing shortage.

=== Social stratification ===
Social stratification 1769–1850 (per cent)
Class	1769	1850
Upper	13	7
Middle	40	12
Lower	47	81

A stratification into three social groups can be made for this era :

1. individuals of rank and officers
2. craftsmen, small-scale entrepreneurs, and officials
3. journeymen, assistants, workers, soldiers, servants, paupers, and prisoners.

Women were associated with their husbands status. However, as craftsmen saw their status sink with the introduction of industrialism, the proletarian class grew during the period. There also was an economic segregation in the city, with the present old town and the lower parts of Norrmalm being the wealthiest (more than 150% above average); and the suburbs (today part of central Stockholm) were poor (50% below average).

== Education ==
Detailed regulations controlled what items should be produced and sold by the guilds, and what was permitted to be sold by retail sellers. Stockholm compared to other Swedish cities had a varied market with a great variation of craftsmanship. This society was built on the burgher class, they were the only "proper" citizens in Swedish cities, i.e. they were given a franchise (burskap), the right to undertake bourgeois activities — trade and craftsmanship — a right tied to an obligation to pay taxes. While the craftsmen's guilds dated back to the 16th century, the trader's societies were largely established during the 18th century. The freedom of trade act of 1846 abolished the guilds which were replaced by crafts associations organizing all craftsmen. Becoming a master craftsman required 3–5 years as an apprentice followed by an examination of a qualifying piece of work. After several years as a journeyman, a masterpiece would be examined by the guild, after which the oath could be sworn before the board of trade; a faith many journeymen would have to wait for many years. In contrast, to become a trader, the act of 1743 required an education of twelve years, an examination period of one year, seven years as a pupil, and four years as a swain at a stall. Manufacturers, however, where not subject for any similar requirements. They had to prove their skills in the trade, but no length of schooling was stipulated.

== Social development ==
The period saw a new bourgeoisie climb the ranks — the so-called Skeppsbroadeln — which made a fortune on the emerging industry and had palaces built on the prestigious quay Skeppsbron and slightly more modest estates on the still rural ridges — many of which has survived in their original states.

== Culture and science ==
The period also saw several scientific novelties: The masonry heater, developed in 1767, revolutionised heating and Serafimerlasarettet, the first modern hospital in Sweden, was inaugurated just north of the present-day City Hall in 1752. In 1753 the Stockholm Observatory was completed by the newly founded Academy of Sciences.

== Trade ==
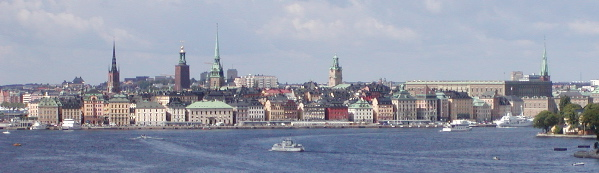
Many of the palaces lined-up along Skeppsbron were built by wealthy bourgeois merchants during the 17th century.

During the 18th century the economic model introduced the previous century was further developed, and Stockholm became the vital centre of trade as governmental departments related to trade were located there: (1) The Mines Authority (Bergskollegium), an independent, public authority founded in 1630 and dissolved in 1857 when replaced by the National Board of Trade (Kommerskollegium). (2) The "Manufacture Office" (Manufakturkontoret), department of the Riksdag of the Estates who gave economic support. i.e. loans and bounties, to manufacturers for the advancement of Swedish trade. The intention with these institutions was to substitute import of expensive goods, such as high-quality textiles, with a domestic production - thus effectively limiting import to raw materials not possible to produce in Sweden, and to keep import of items produced by Swedish manufactures out by means of customs, while promoting import of raw materials needed by the manufactures with bounties and other relieves. Factories were built that could produce goods at a larger scale than traditional handicraft, for example large-scale farming to produce wool of high quality. To this end, rural areas in Sweden (including Finland) were divided into "spinning districts", each of which was controlled by a monopoly often held by a manufacture in Stockholm. During the later part of the 18th century, annually, approximately 6.000 households on the Swedish countryside were busy spinning wool for these manufactures. During the period, Sweden was the dominant producer of top-quality iron and Stockholm remained the most important transit point for iron trade with bar iron from Bergslagen being delivered to the international market by the wealthy wholesalers at Skeppsbron.

=== Chartered companies ===
Following the Greater Wrath, Russian occupation of Finland 1714-21, trade and shipping in Stockholm had virtually ceased to exist with the trade fleet reduced to a hundred vessels of moderate size. Notwithstanding the seemingly hopeless situation, the Age of Liberty (1718–72) was an era of prosperity and prospects. As soon as export could be taken up again, demand for iron, copper, and tar remained constantly high. At the same time, domestic shipping was promoted by lighter custom duties and by a mercantile act introduced in 1724 which limited goods imported by foreign ships to import goods originating from the ship's native country. There was, however, a lack of domestic capital; a shortage solved by cash input from foreign trade houses and wholesale companies in Stockholm and Gothenburg. During the 17th century, traders in Stockholm made several failed attempts to establish chartered companies to promote foreign trade. For example, the Levant Company was founded in 1738 but was however discontinued in the mid-1760s due to limited economic progress. Swedish colonization of St Barthélemy resulted in the creation of the West India Company in 1786; a successful enterprise during the Napoleonic era dissolved in 1805 when free trade bared it from its privileges.

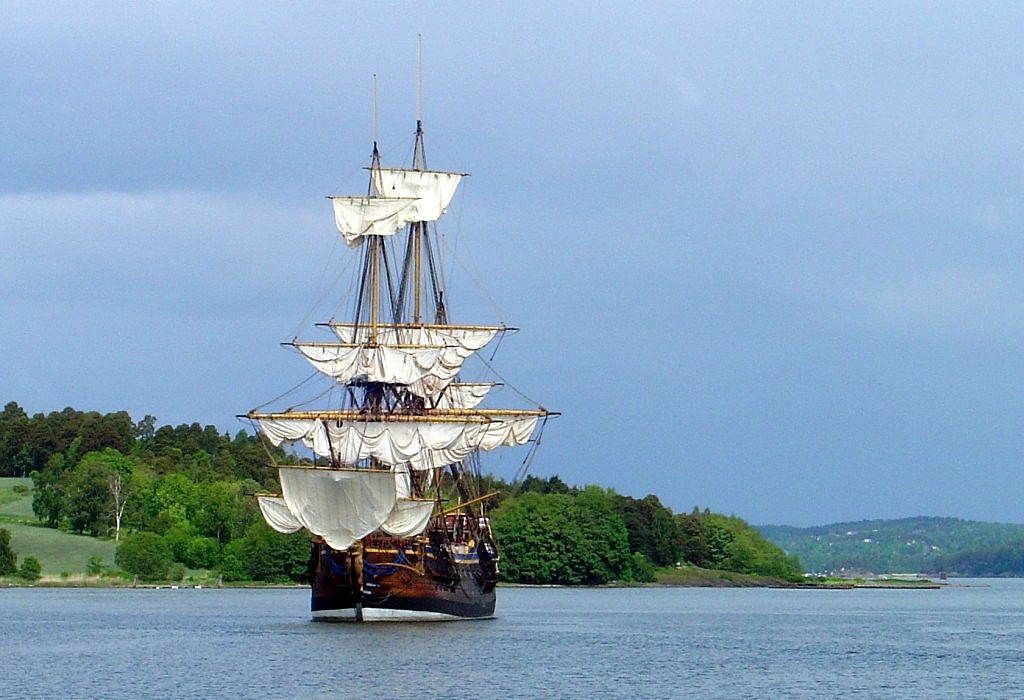
East Indiaman Götheborg visiting Norway in 2005.

The more successful Swedish East India Company (1731-1813) was, like most of the chartered companies, initiated by traders with a foreign background (Henrich König, Germany; Colin Campbell, Scotland; and Frans Bedoire, France) and its headquarters were located in Gothenburg. The company, however, was of significant importance to Stockholm because of the shipbuilding yards, the trade houses, and the exotic products imported by the company. In order to make the trips financially interesting the ships had to be made large, and to make the trips safe the ships had to be heavily armed. Shipbuilding facilities in Stockholm were adapted to achieve this, and shortly after the foundation of the company a fourth shipyard — Djurgårdsvarvet — with suitable capacity was built in Stockholm and in the mid-1730s the oldest shipyard in the city — Stadens stora skeppsvarv — was enlarged under a direction which included several of the founding members of the company. The company's whereabouts are difficult to trace due to its secretive nature, but preserved historical records unveils 26 of the company's 37 ships were built at the shipyards in Stockholm, most of them around the 1740s. The ship Terra Nova, built in 1771 at the large Terra Nova shipyard just north of Stockholm, was in service until 1786, and was centuries later used as a prototype for the East Indiaman Götheborg built 1995-2003, and Götheborg, built at the same shipyard in 1738 and lost in 1745. Clasons varv, inaugurated in 1725 on Blasieholmen where Vasa was built a century earlier. covered most of the area were today is Nationalmuseum and produced at least four ships for the company. These ships were full-rigged, the shipyards were large employers and dozens of subcontractors in the city were tied to them. Furthermore, before these ships left Stockholm some 100-150 men per ship were recruited, most of them in the city, and as a single trip to China would take 1–2 years the company had a huge impact on Stockholm during this era.

== See also ==
- History of Sweden (1772-1809)
- Bollhuset
