= Sillhovet =

Coordinates: 59.3290°N 18.0774°E

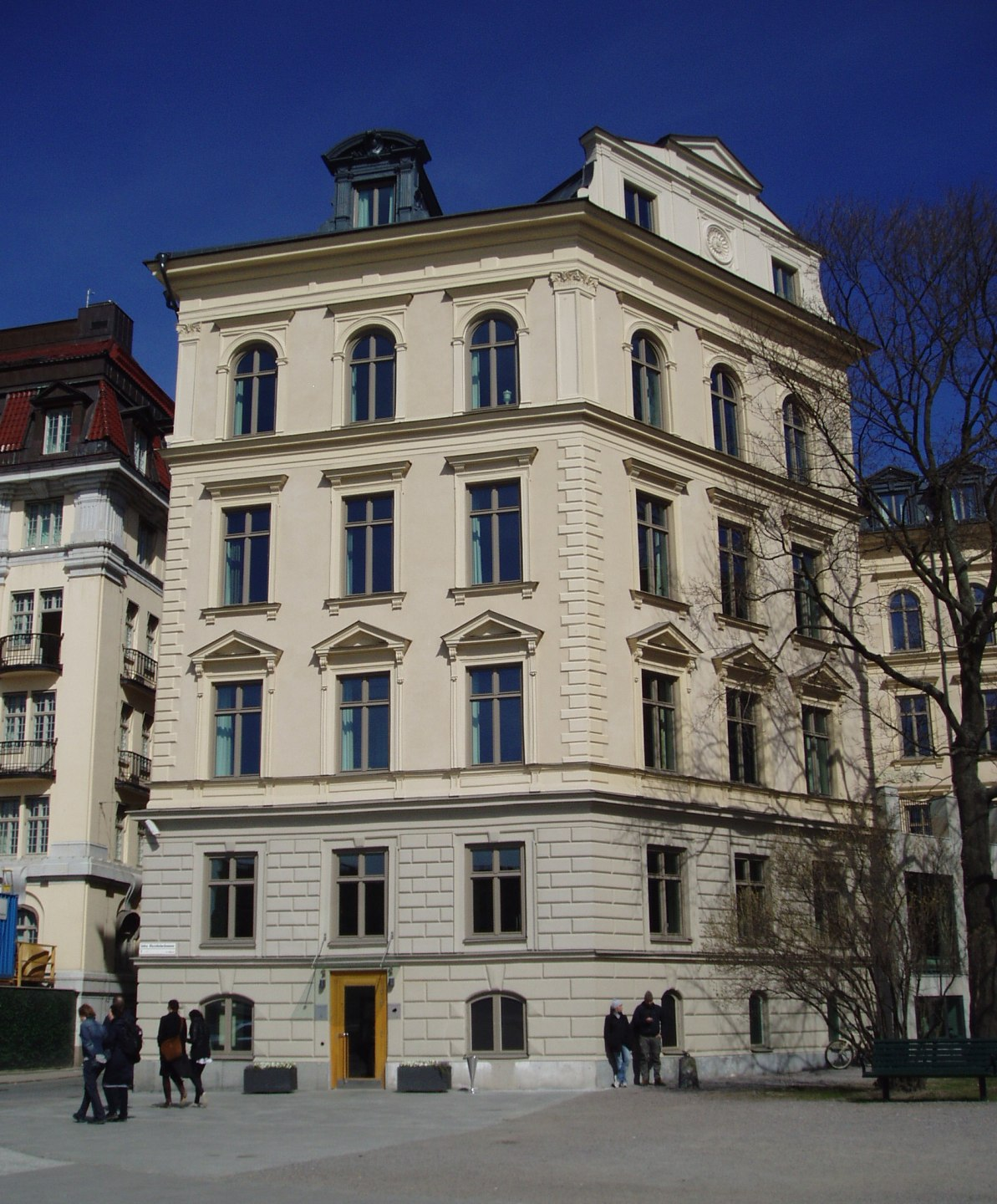
View of Sillhovet and Lydmar Hotel

Sillhovet is a city block in central Stockholm. It lies on Blasieholmen close to the National museum and was built in the 1700s.
