= Ragnhild Grågås =

Ragnhild Grågås (died 1510) was a 15th century resident of Stockholm, Sweden. She was the person after whom Gåsgränd in Gamla stan was named.

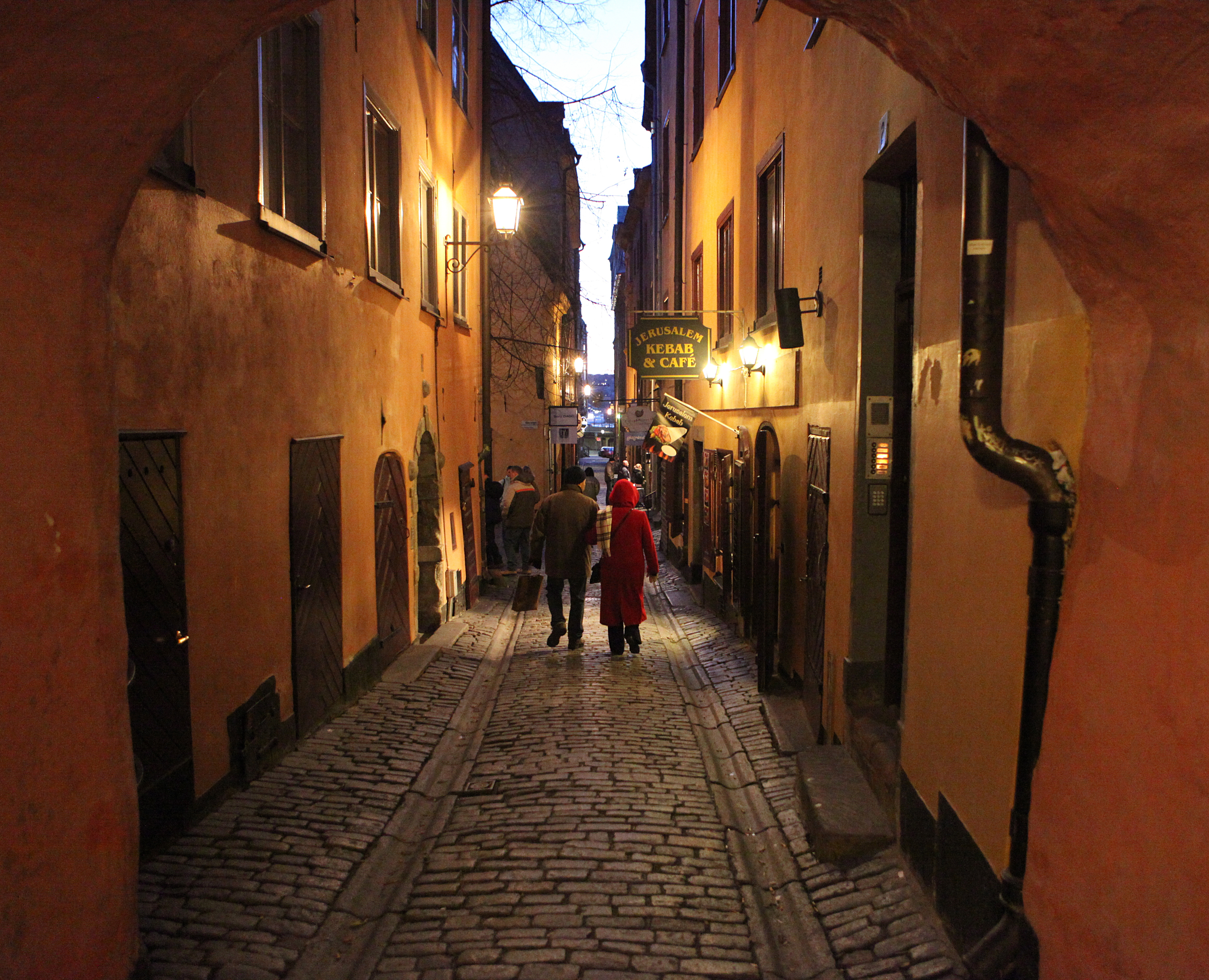
Gåsgränd seen from Västerlånggatan

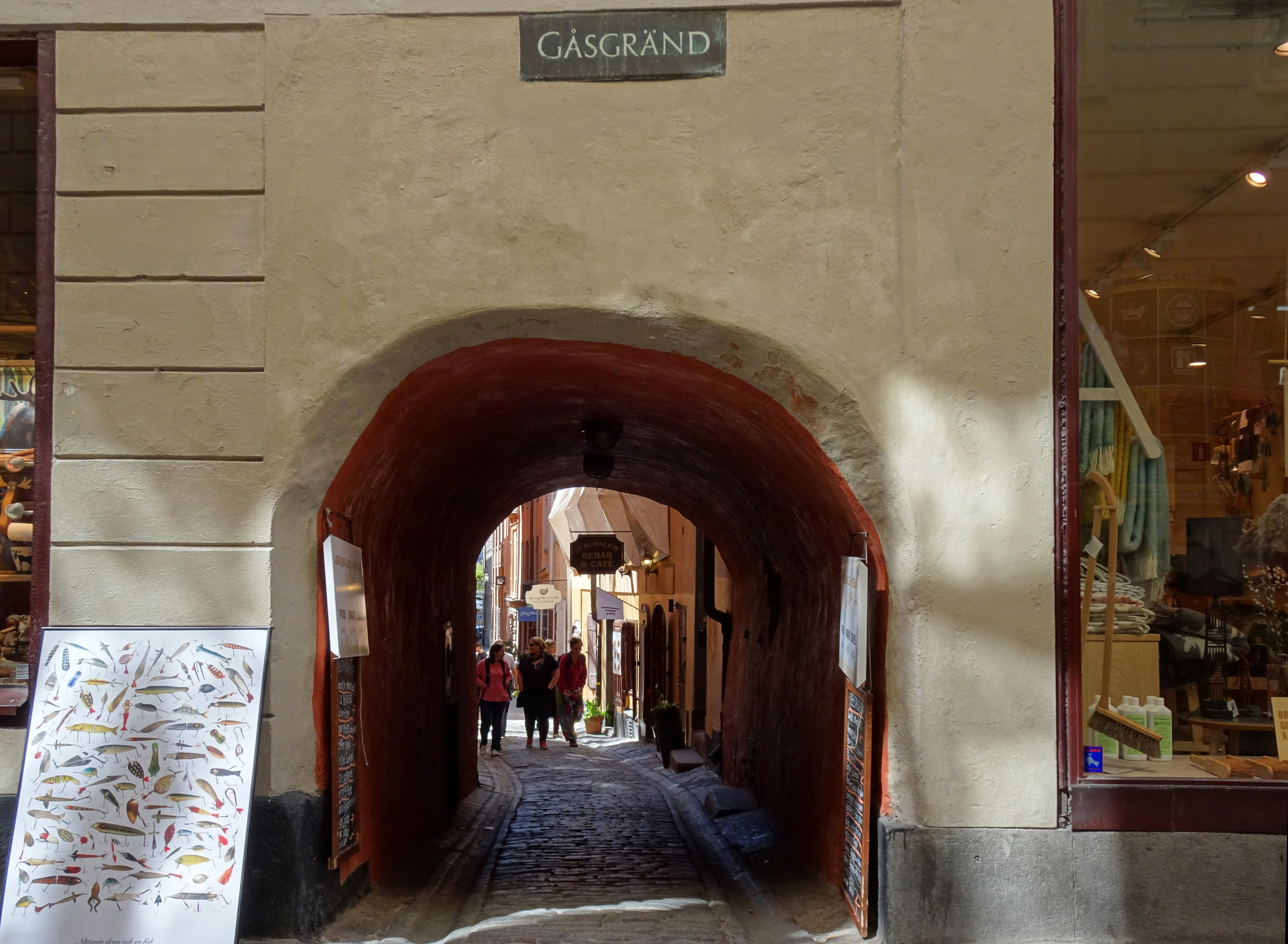
Gåsgränd entrance

== History ==
Grågås was the centre of a court case. On 23 June 1477, she and her daughter were accused by Sigrid, the wife of Jens Bok, of having had sexual intercourse with her husband. This was regarded as indirect incest according to contemporary law and was a serious crime punishable by death. The court, however, dismissed the charges, as Grågås and her daughter had already previously been accused of the same crime, and already been acquitted of it. Instead, Sigrid was sentenced to banishment from the capital for slander. The sentence was revoked after Grågås and her daughter asked for mercy for Sigrid.

Grågås's will is known from 1513, and she is regarded to have died a few years prior. Grågås's spouse owned property at Gåsgränd, which she later came to own herself. The case against Grågås apparently attracted a lot of attention in contemporary Stockholm, and the location was already called Gåsgränd prior her death.

== See also ==
- Gåstorget

== Other Sources ==
- Lisbet Scheutz (2001 (2003) nuytgåva). Berömda och glömda stockholmskvinnor: sju stadsvandringar: 155 kvinnoporträtt. Stockholm: MBM. ISBN 91-973725-3-6 Libris 8392583
- Ragnhild Grågås var en ärbar kvinna
- Wrangel, Fredrik Ulrik: Stockholmiana (1912)
