= Skeppsholmsbron =

Coordinates: 59°19′38″N 18°04′45″E

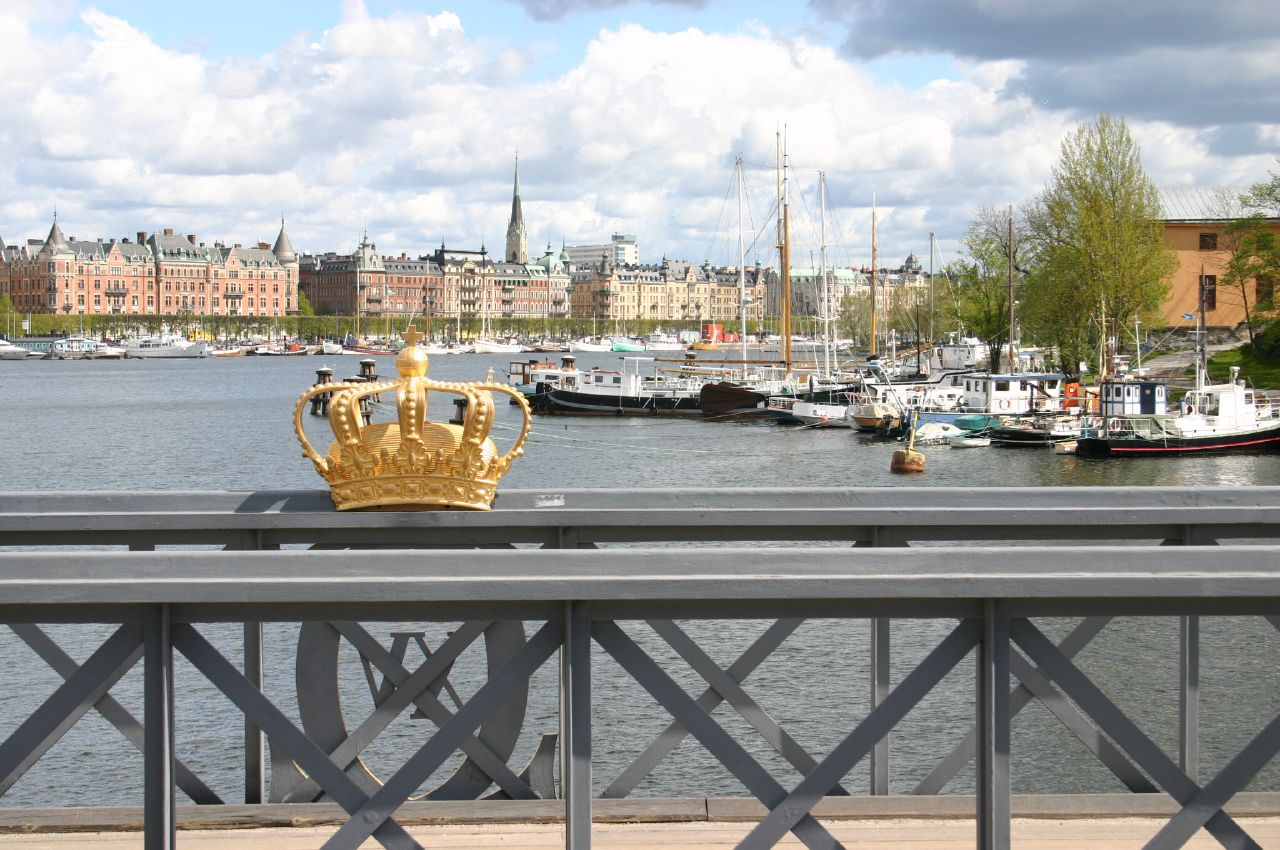
Gilded crown on Skeppsholmsbron with Strandvägen in the background.

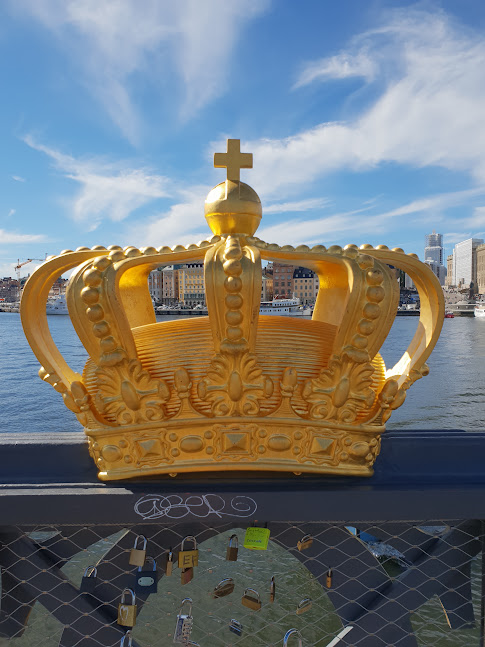
Gilded crown on the western side

Skeppsholmsbron (Swedish: "The Skeppsholm Bridge") is in central Stockholm, Sweden, connecting Blasieholmen to Skeppsholmen.

The bridge, 165 metres long and 9.5 metres wide, consists of a 5.5 metre wide roadway flanked by 2 metre pathways, and has 5 arches. It was the first forged iron bridge to be constructed in Sweden, manufactured by Motala Verkstad in 1861.

The Gilded Crowns on Skeppsholmsbron are a set of two crowns at the midpoint of the bridge. The crown is a symbol of Sweden and the Royal Family of Sweden and it can be clearly seen on the Coat of arms of Sweden.

The first bridge to connect Skeppsholmen to the rest of the city was a wooden bridge on poles, simply called Holmbron ("The Islet Bridge") and provided with a drawbridge, constructed by the admiralty in 1638-1640 when the camp of the Swedish Navy was relocated from Blasieholmen to Skeppsholmen. In 1822 the bridge was damaged in a fire, and subsequently replaced by a temporary pontoon bridge. Funded directly and still owned by the state, the present steel bridge was finally inaugurated in 1861.

In 1935 the bridge together with other building and structures on Skeppsholmen and Kastellholmen were classified as historical landmarks, thus prohibiting replacing the bridge or altering its exterior, a decision nevertheless reassessed in the 1990s.

== See also ==
- List of bridges in Stockholm
- Kastellholmsbron
- Strömbron
