= Ignatiigränd =

Alley in Gamla stan, Stockholm, Sweden

Coordinates: 59°19′30.5″N 18°04′06.8″E

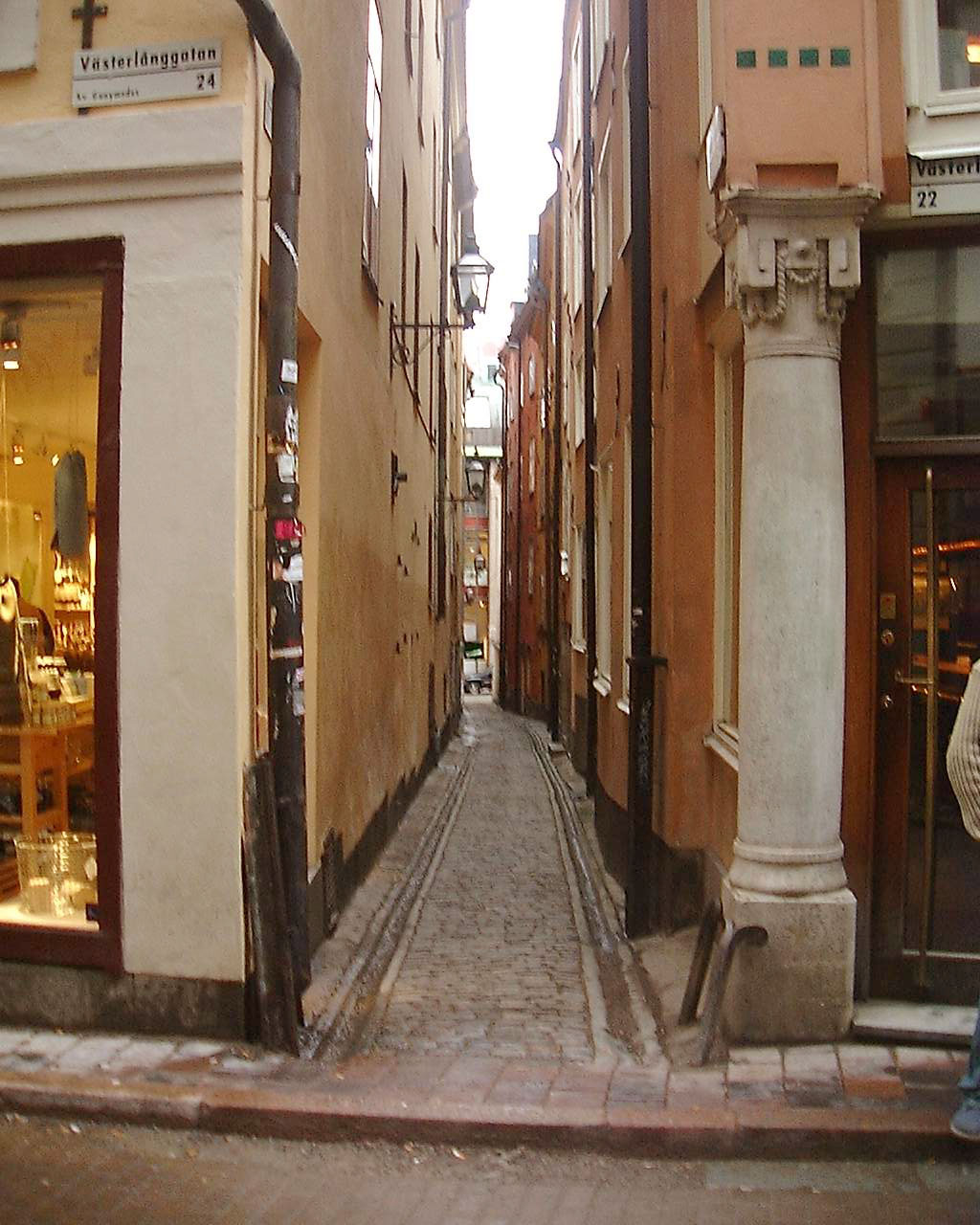
Ignatiigränd in March 2007.

Ignatiigränd is an alley in Gamla stan, the old town in central Stockholm, Sweden. Stretching from Västerlånggatan to Stora Nygatan, it forms a parallel street to Göran Hälsinges gränd and Gåsgränd.

== History ==
The alley is called Mårten Klinks gränd ("Mårten Klink's alley") in 1606 in reference to a local proprietor and in 1661 it is referred to as Mårten Klinkas eller Ignatij Grendh ("Mårten Klink's or Ignatius's alley"). The latter was a famous printer named Ignatius Meurer (1589–1672) who was, according to a memorial verse found in the Royal Library, born in Blankenburg, Schwarzburg, Germany, immigrated to Stockholm in 1610 and eventually through marriage became the owner of a printing workshop and settled in the block north of the alley. He is known to have produced the city law of 1628, introducing the Antiqua typeface in Sweden. (See also Staffan Sasses Gränd.)

The first element of the name, Ignatii-, is the Latin genitive form of Ignatius (e.g. Ignatius's; of Ignatius).

== See also ==
- List of streets and squares in Gamla stan
