= Gåsgränd =

Alley in Gamla stan, Stockholm, Sweden

Coordinates: 59°19′30.4″N 18°04′07.6″E

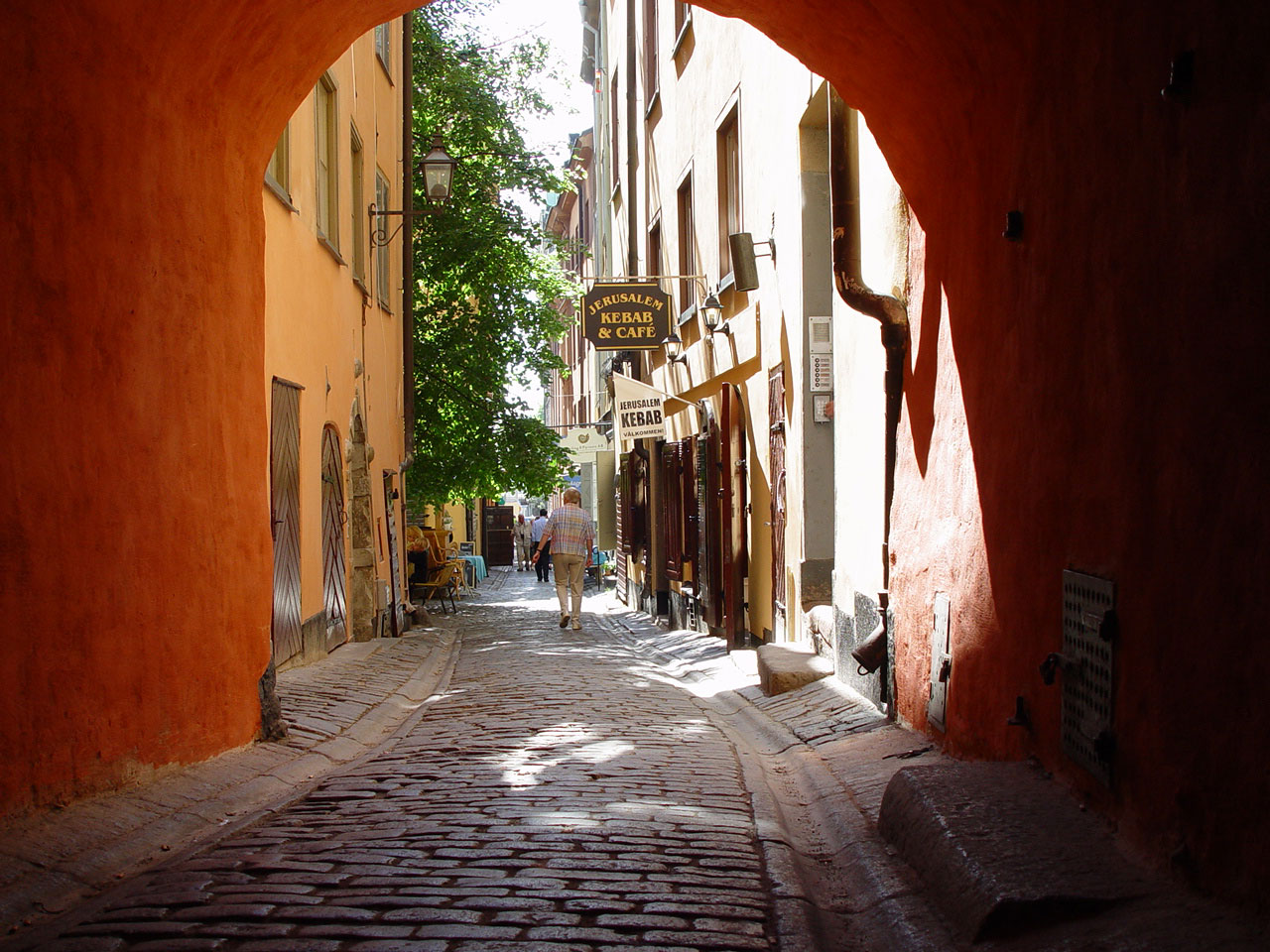
Gåsgränd viewed from Västerlånggatan in June 2004.

Gåsgränd (Swedish: "Goose Alley") is an alley in Gamla stan, the old town in central Stockholm, Sweden. Connecting the streets Västerlånggatan, Stora Nygatan, and Lilla Nygatan, it forms a parallel street to Ignatiigränd and Överskärargränd, and leads down to the square Munkbron on the western waterfront of the old town. On the upper stretch of the alley is a small square, Gåstorget.

== History ==
In the 15th and 16th century, the alley was named Grågåsens gränd ("Alley of the Grey-Goose") after a woman, Ragnhild Grågås, who lived in the alley around 1500. It is mentioned in 1492 as Gragasenne grendh and referred to a few years later as nest nordan hwstrv Ragnil Gragossenne gardh ("next north of wife Ragnil Gragossenne's homestead"). In 1513, a Gragasene grend is mentioned as is an old house Ragnil Gragas geffuit hade j testament ("...given had in [the] testament").

During the 17th century, however, the most commonly used name for the alley was Anders Siggessons gränd ("Alley of Anders Siggesson", 1594); a hundred years later, the alley was referred to as Saltmätargränd ("Salt Gauger's Alley", 1669), most likely after a Bertil Mattsson who bought a property in the alley in 1652. On a map dated 1733, the western part is marked as Saltmätargränd, while the eastern is called Gåsgränd, the former made a section of the latter in 1885.

== See also ==
- List of streets and squares in Gamla stan
