= Blasieholmen Church =

Coordinates: 59.3299°N 18.0766°E

- Blasieholmskyrkan
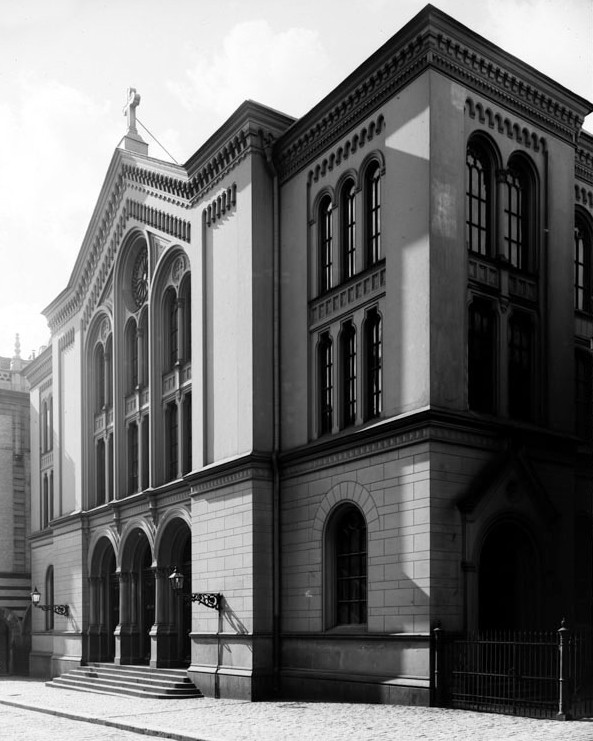
- Blasieholmen Church before 1920
- Blasieholmen Church
- Location: Stockholm
- Country: Sweden

History
- Consecrated: 12 January 1868

Architecture
- Demolished: 1964

Blasieholmen Church (Swedish: Blasieholmskyrkan) was a Lutheran church at Blasieholmen in Stockholm built in 1867 and inaugurated with a church service on 12 January 1868. It was demolished in 1964. It was built on the initiative of the priest Gustaf Emanuel Beskow.
