= Intendenturförrådet =

Coordinates: 59°19′27″N 18°04′55″E

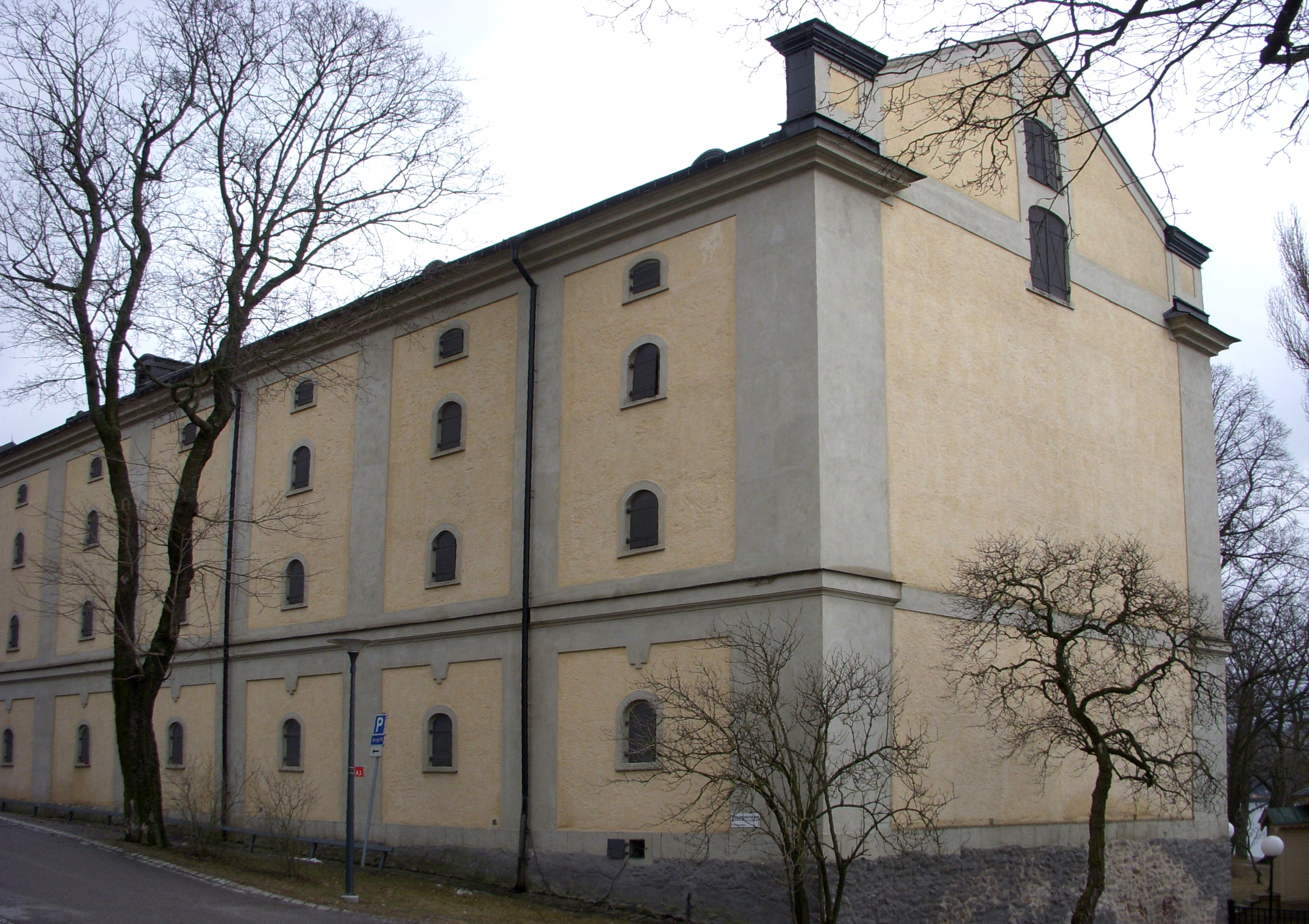
Intendenturförrådet (2009)

Intendenturförrådet (Swedish: Commissariat Warehouse) is a building on the islet Skeppsholmen in central Stockholm, Sweden.

Designed by the city architect Johan Eberhard Carlberg (1683-1773) in 1728 and completed in 1731, the warehouse was where the Crown kept grains and other goods collected as taxes paid in kind. By 1795 it was briefly used to store the royal trophies before it was rebuilt into an Army storage in 1795. It then escaped two attempts by the Navy to transform it into a barrack in 1829 and 1898, and is still used for storage. While the plain buttoned-up exterior with its small arched windows and simple verticals is striking contrast to the contemporary Grand-Baroque Stockholm Palace across the water, the warehouse remains unique in several ways: It is the only historical structure on Skeppsholmen never used by the Navy; the only remaining major building by Carlberg; and it is arguably the only building of its kind in Stockholm which remains unaltered since its construction.

In 2006, the building was one of several potential locations identified for a proposed new Design Museum in Stockholm. As of 2012, the plans for such a museum had not moved forward.

== See also ==
- Swedish Army Quartermaster Corps
- History of Stockholm
