= Överskärargränd =

Alley in Gamla stan, Stockholm, Sweden

Coordinates: 59°19′29.7″N 18°04′07.1″E

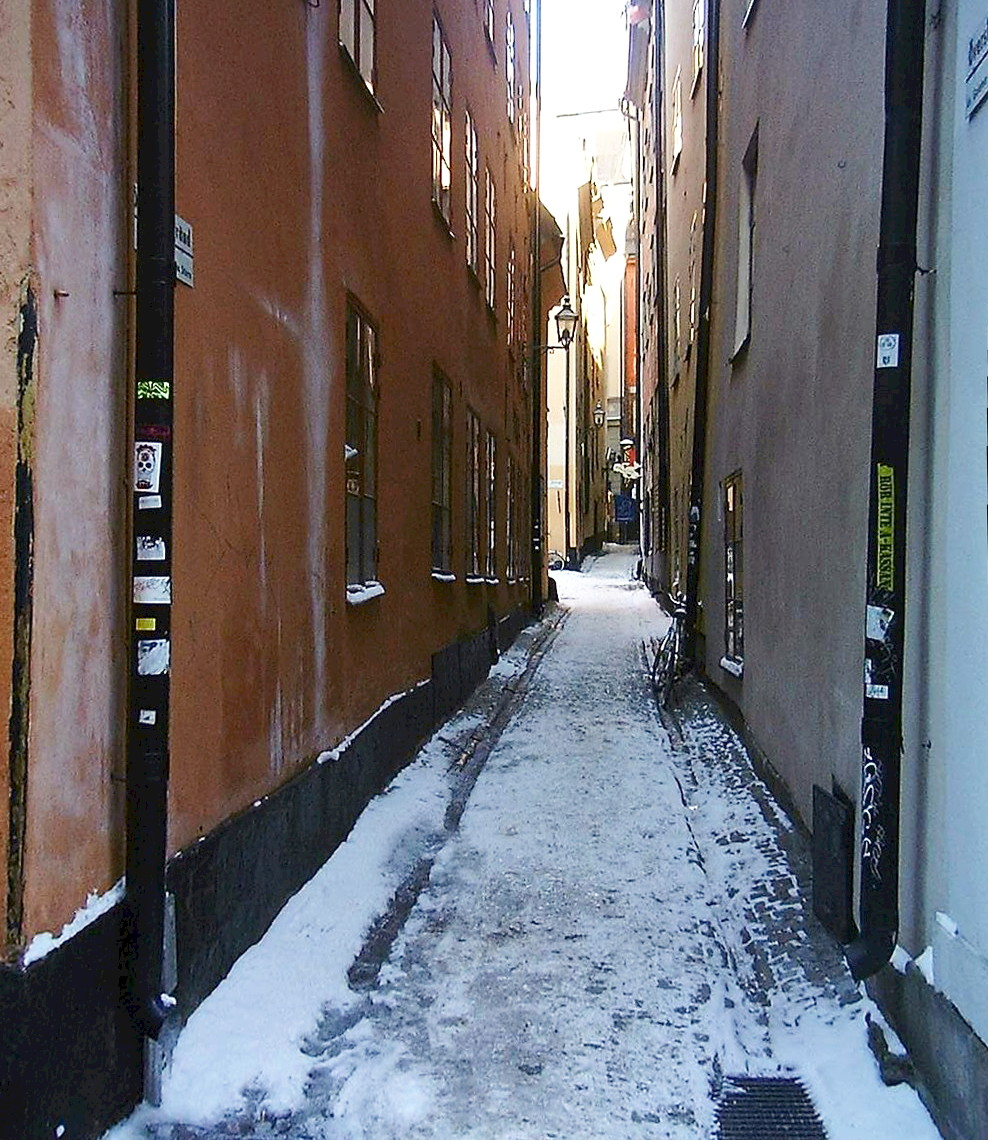
Överskärargränd in February 2007.

Överskärargränd is an alley in Gamla stan, the old town in central Stockholm, Sweden. Stretching from Västerlånggatan to Stora Nygatan passing on the south side of Gåstorget, it forms a parallel street to Gåsgränd and Sven Vintappares Gränd.

== History ==
The alley was named Erik Ingemundssons gränd ("Alley of Erik Ingemundsson") in 1619, in reference to the mayor (1581–1622) who owned a property in the alley. While the present name appears in historical records as Öfwerskiärare gränden in 1684, and a certain Absalon överskärare is mentioned in 1643 as having bought a property near that of the mayor, it remains uncertain which of the masters of the trade gave his name to the alley. Notwithstanding, an överskärare was an occupation which could be translated to "wool cloth finisher", a man who would go over carded wool with a pair of scissors to remove upstanding hairs in order to make the cloth perfectly smooth, masters of the trade being merchants with their own workshops.

== See also ==
- List of streets and squares in Gamla stan
