= Prästgården =

Coordinates: 59°19′30″N 18°05′04″E

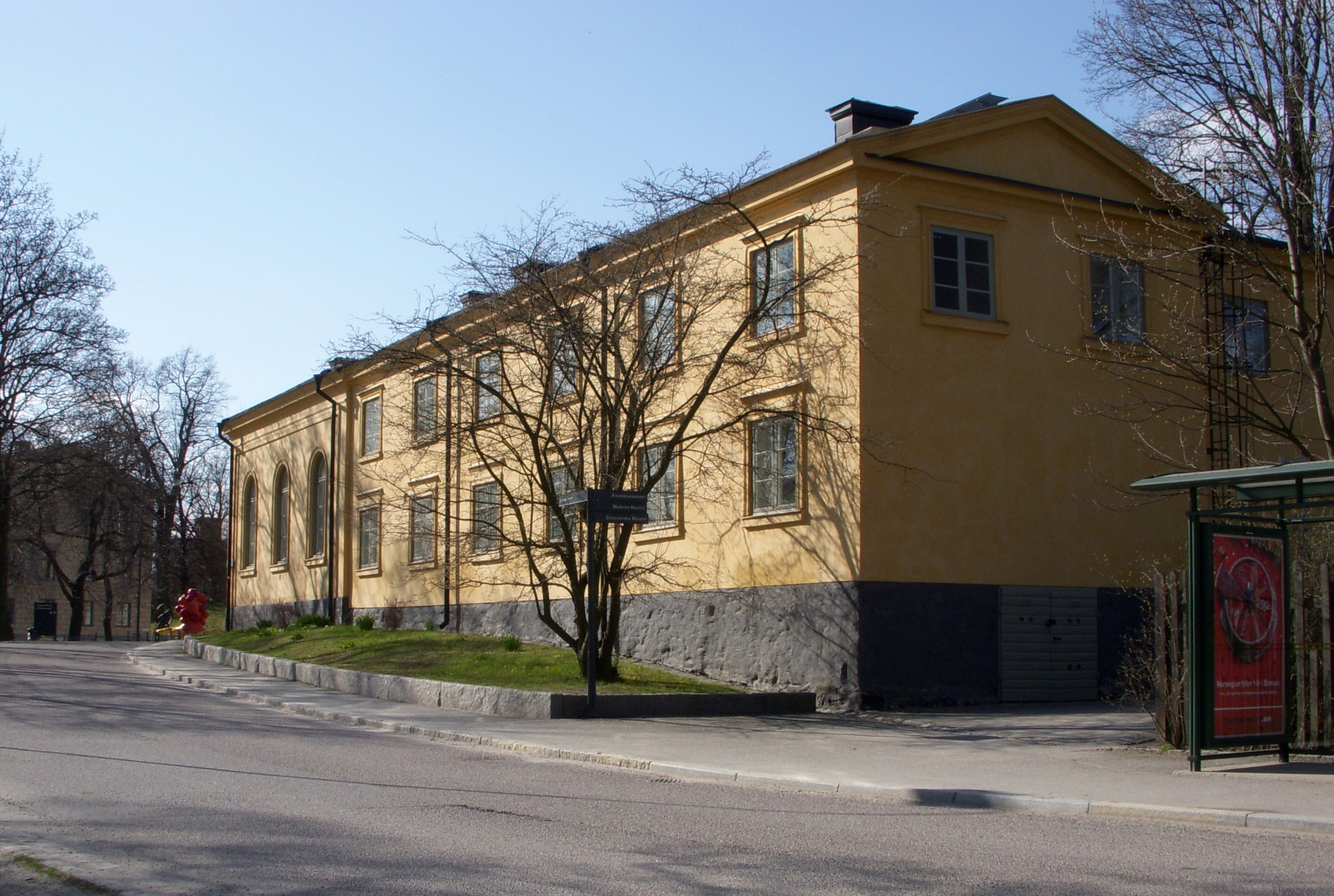
The southwestern side of Prästgårdens fasad, April 2009.

Prästgården (Swedish: "The Parsonage") is a building on the islet Skeppsholmen in central Stockholm, Sweden.

In the 1730s it became increasingly apparent the working force on the island needed a place to spend their resting time, and in 1739 a one-storey building was built south of the present-day Moderna Museet, the stone floor giving the building the nickname Stenkrogen ("The Stone Tavern"). By the end of the century, the building was then used as a canteen and as barracks for naval reserve force By the 1840s, the first classrooms established in the building in the early 1920s had been expanded to occupy the entire building, subsequently enlarged and repaired in 1865, and, as the large windows in the western end can tell, meeting the new state policy for school buildings. In 1926–1927, the building was repaired again to accommodate the naval station's priest, a chapel, and idyllic garden - since bearing the name Prästgården ("The Parsonage") Today it is part of the Modern Museum, who use it for its sculptural park.

== See also ==
- History of Skeppsholmen
- History of Stockholm
