= Kastellholmsbron =

Coordinates: 59°19′25.3″N 18°5′15.5″E

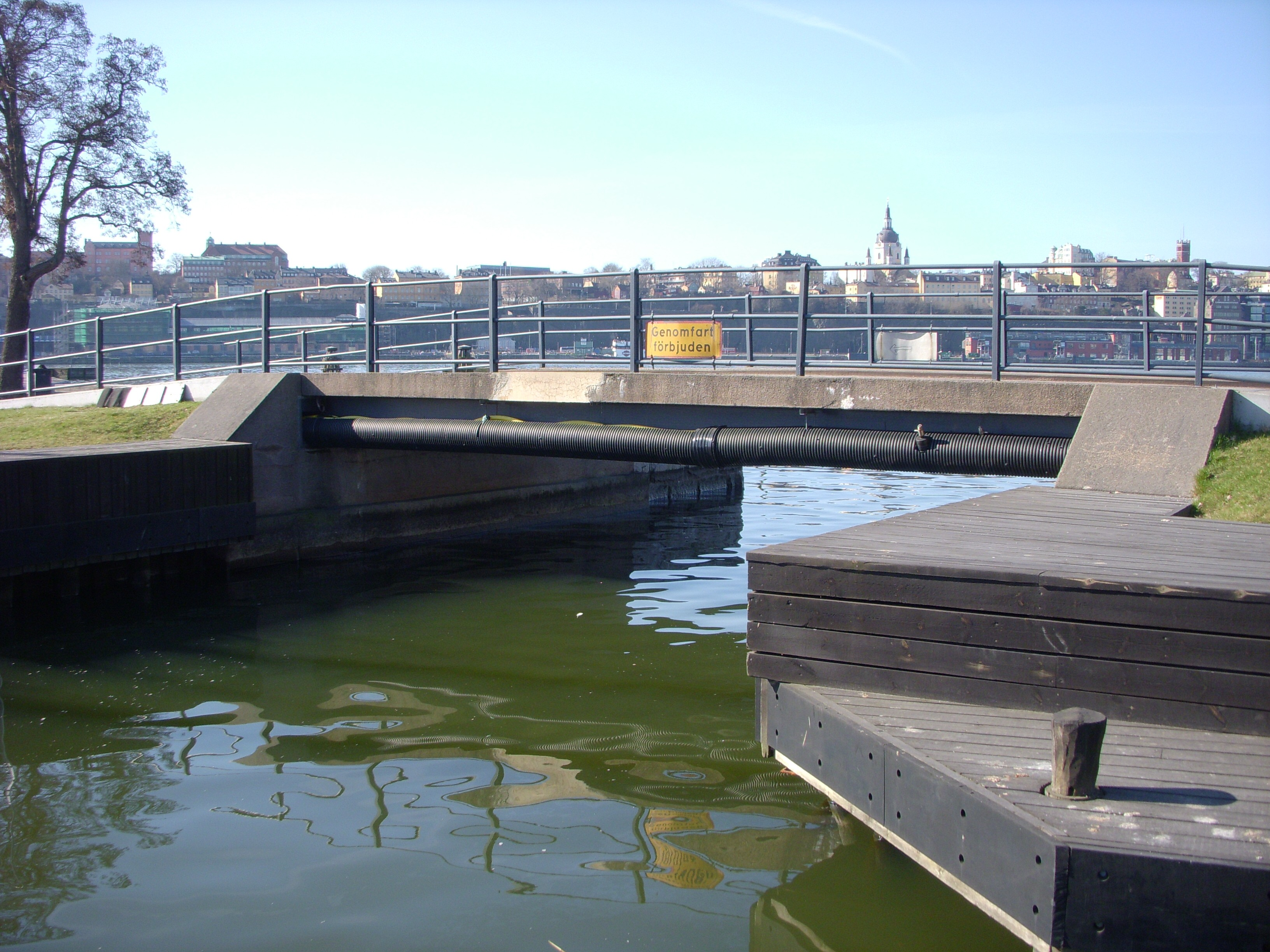
Kastellholmsbron

Kastellholmsbron (Swedish: "The Citadel Islet Bridge") is a small bridge in central Stockholm, Sweden, connecting the small island Kastellholmen to Skeppsholmen.

The name is derived from the citadel, lending its name to the entire island. The first citadel was constructed in the 1640s together with the bridge. The citadel was then replaced, first in 1746, and then again following a major explosion in 1848. The present bridge dates from 1880, but has been rebuilt since.

== See also ==
- List of bridges in Stockholm
- Skeppsholmsbron
