= Teater Galeasen =

Coordinates: 59°19′38″N 18°05′00″E

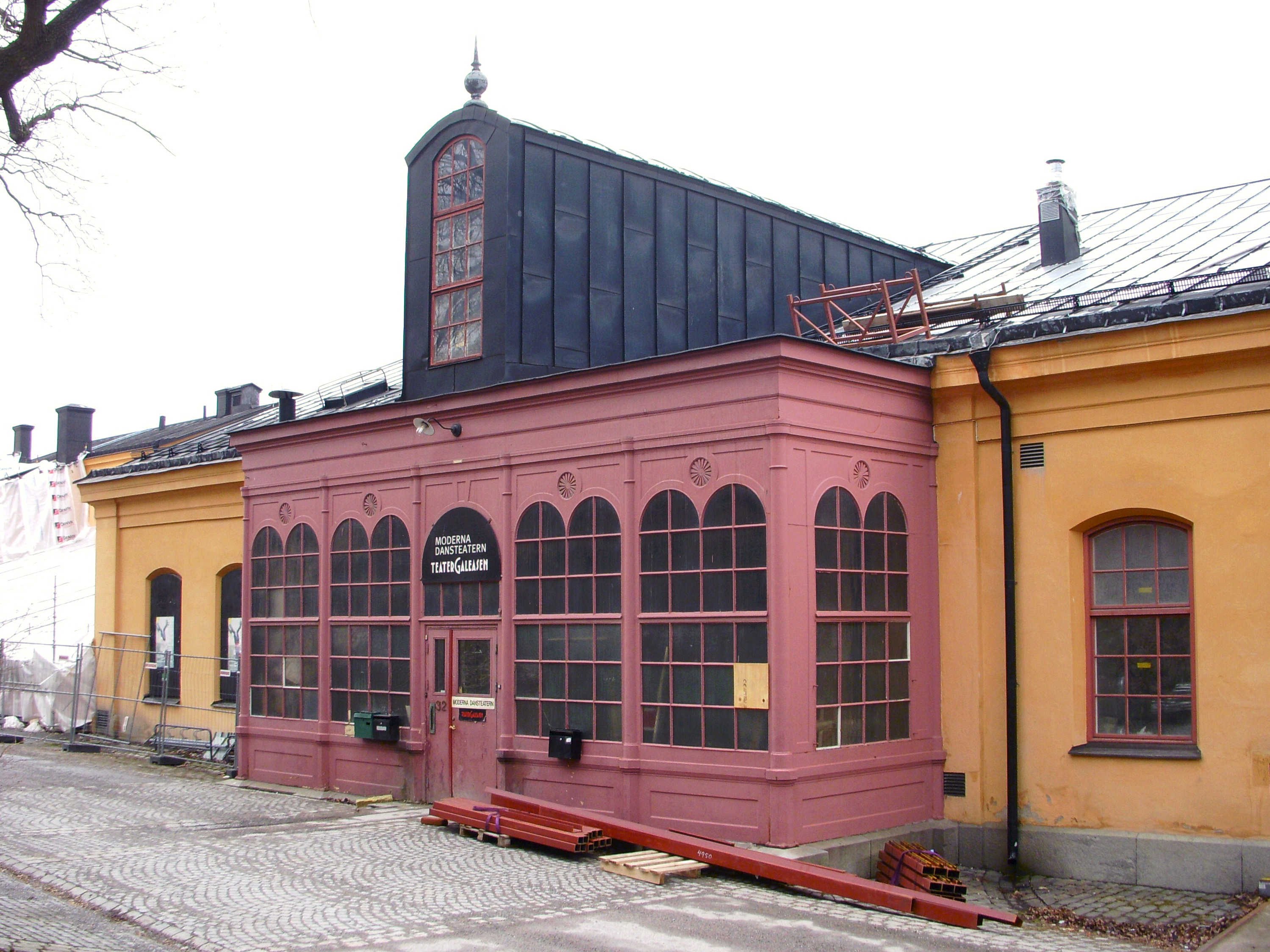
Galeasen Theatre on Skeppsholmen in Stockholm

Teater Galeasen is an independent Swedish theatre group based at Skeppsholmen in Stockholm. It was founded in 1983.

Teater Galeasen is known for their singular, avant-garde and experimental productions of both classic and contemporary dramatic work. They work with freelance actors and directors.
