= Gåstorget =

Square in Gamla stan, Stockholm, Sweden

Coordinates: 59°19′30.1″N 18°04′7.4″E

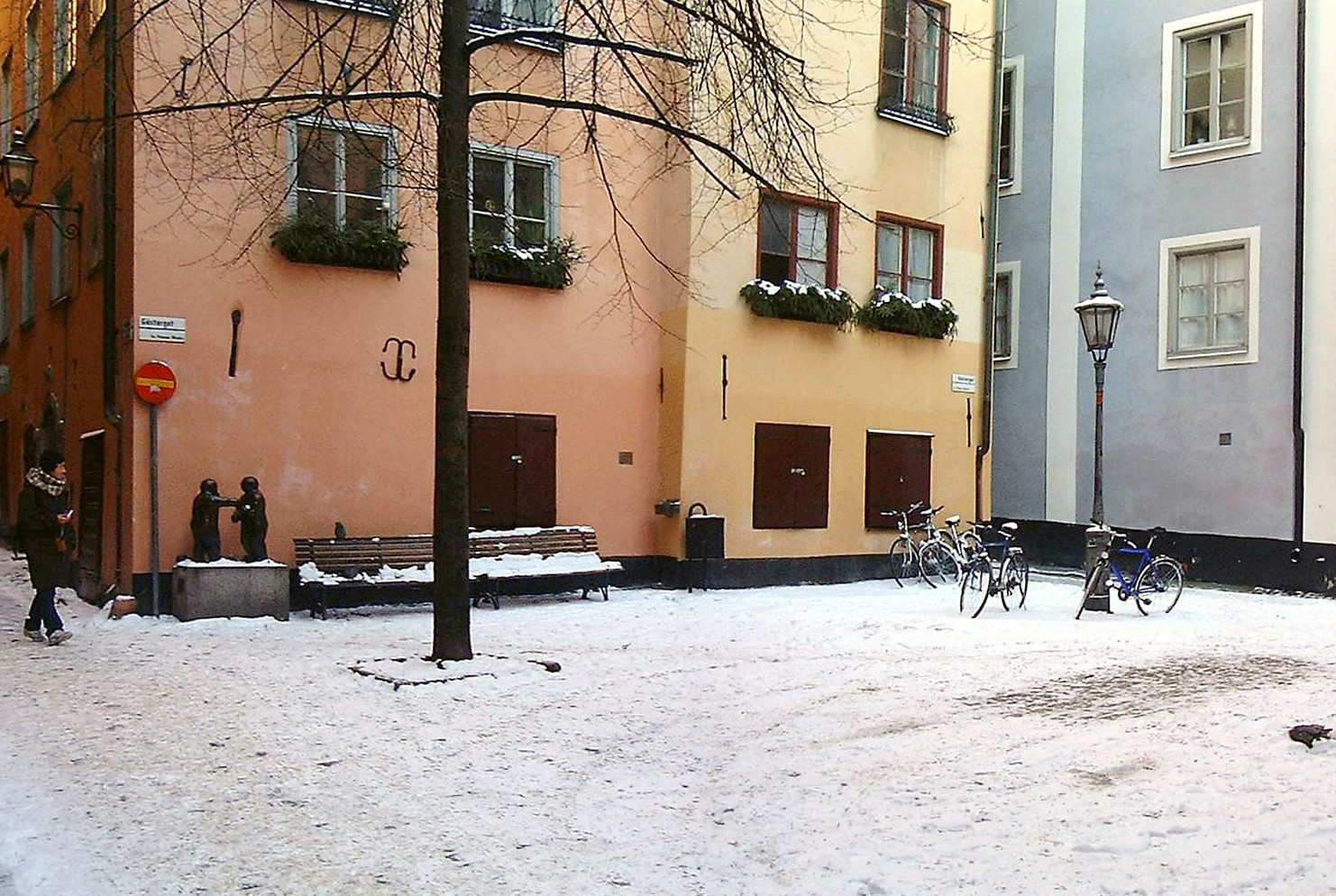
Gåstorget in February 2007

Gåstorget (Swedish: "Goose Square") is a small public square in Gamla stan, the old town in central Stockholm, Sweden, situated between the two alleys Överskärargränd and Gåsgränd.

== History ==
In 1730, city engineer Johan Eberhard Carlberg proposed that spaces for horse-drawn vehicle be created at various locations though to the city, mostly to facilitate fire fighting. In 1796 such a space was created on the present location. Though the square was not given an official name, it was informally referred to as Gåsplan ("Goose Plain") or Gåsgtorget. A 1981 proposal to name the square after the troubadour Evert Taube was rejected, and the common name was made official.

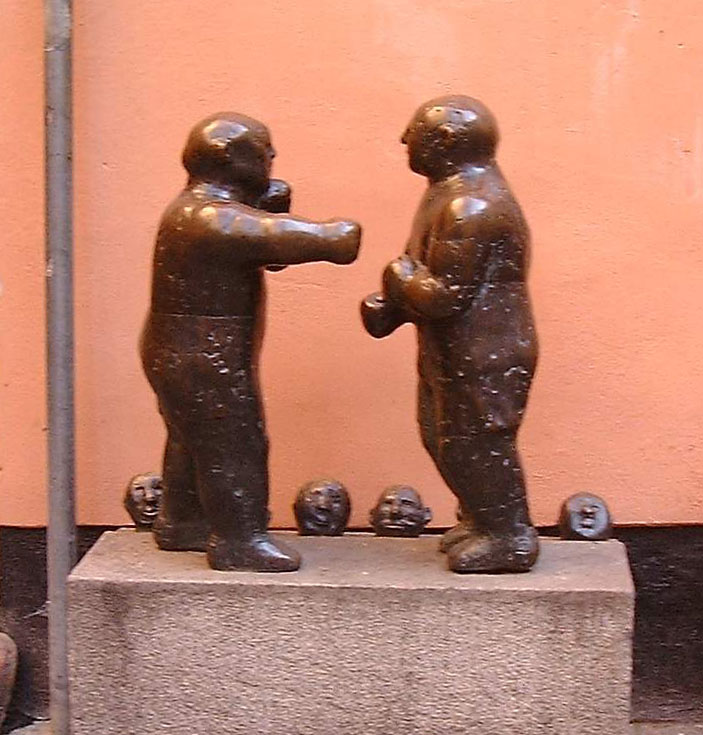
Close-up of the sculpture

== Sculpture ==
On the square is a one metre tall bronze sculpture on a granite base, Tungviktare ("Heavyweights") from 1967 by the sculptor Sven Lundqvist.

== See also ==
- List of streets and squares in Gamla stan
- Sven Vintappares Torg
