= Sven Vintappares torg =

Public square in Gamla stan, the old town in central Stockholm, Sweden

Coordinates: 59°19′29.49″N 18°04′07.95″E

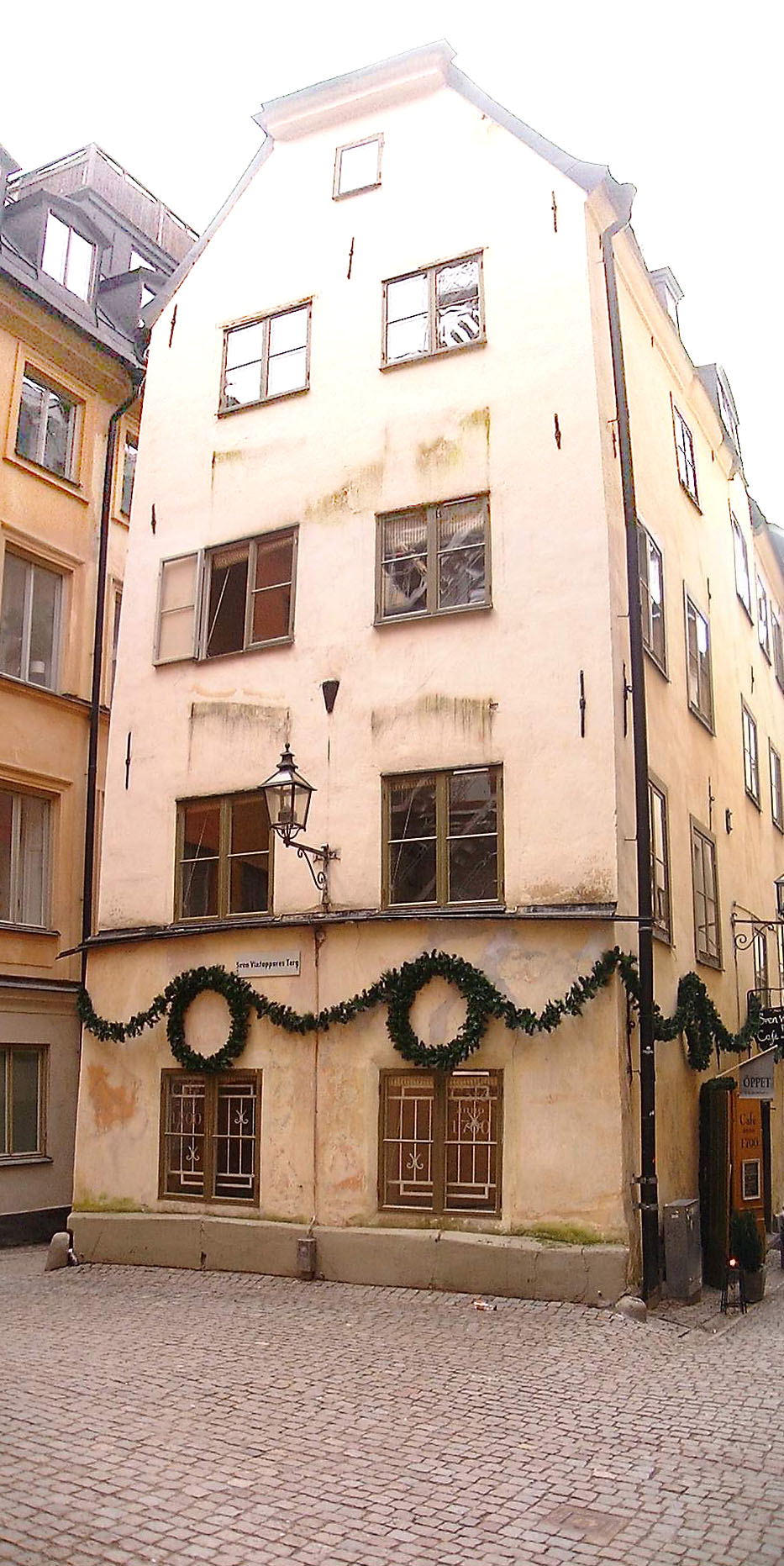
Façade at Sven Vintappares torg in March 2007.

Vera Siöcronas torg (Swedish "Square of Vera Siöcrona") is a small public square in Gamla stan, the old town in central Stockholm, Sweden. North and south of the square are the alleys Sven Vintappares gränd and Didrik Ficks gränd, both leading to Västerlånggatan and Stora Nygatan.

Like the neighbouring square Gåstorget situated a block further north and several other small open spaces in the old town, Sven Vintappares Torg, which was its name before 2018, was created during the 18th century as a turning space for horse-drawn vehicles, which was badly needed in the narrow medieval urban throng.

Presumably, the square remained nameless for many years, before the current name was proposed in 2002.

== See also ==
- List of streets and squares in Gamla stan
