= Johan Eberhard Carlberg =

Swedish architect

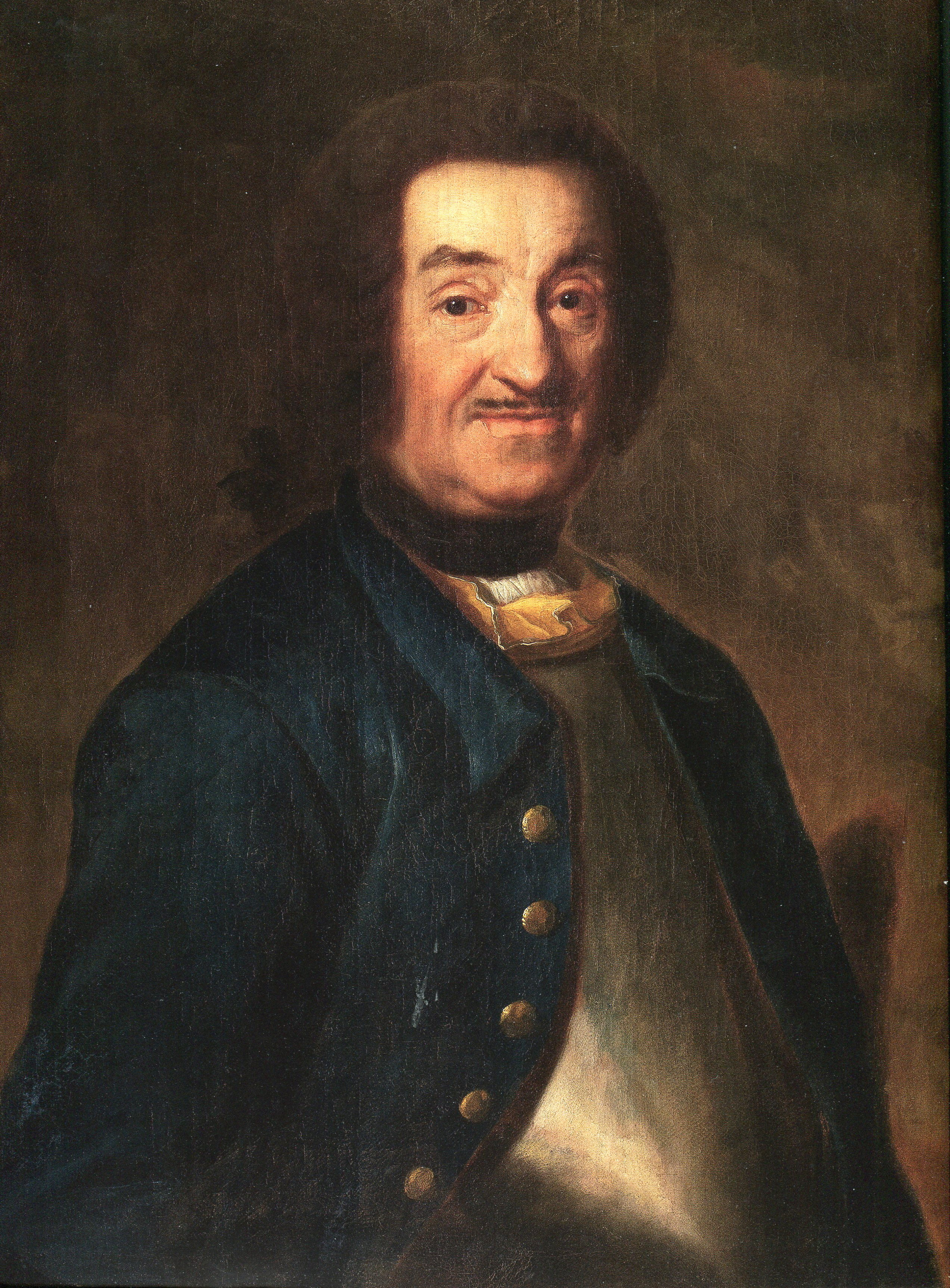
- J E Carlberg
- Born: 24 February 1683; Gothenburg, Sweden
- Died: 22 October 1773 (aged 90); Stockholm, Sweden
- Citizenship: Swedish
- Occupations: Architect, fortification officer
- Spouse(s): Magdalena von Seth (m. 1708; died 1717) Birgitta Thingvall (m. 1718; died 1732) Christina Engel Geijer (m. 1733)
- Relatives: Bengt Wilhelm Carlberg (brother)
- Buildings: Intendenturförrådet, Skeppsholmen; Private residence, Hornsgatan 24
- Projects: Rebuilding of Slussen; Customs pavilions at Norrtull; Alstavik on Långholmen; Danviken Hospital; Church tower of Stockholm's Great Church; Bonde Palace; Stora Sjötullen, Blockhusudden

Johan Eberhard Carlberg (24 February 1683 in Gothenburg, Sweden – 22 October 1773 in Stockholm) was a Swedish fortification officer and architect. He was Gothenburg's first city engineer, a position he held from 1717 until 1727. In 1727, he was appointed city architect in Stockholm, where he stayed for 45 years until 1772. During this time, he also began an influential school of architecture. He was an older brother of the engineer and architect Bengt Wilhelm Carlberg, who replaced him as a city engineer in Gothenburg when Johan Eberhard moved to Stockholm.

== Life and works ==
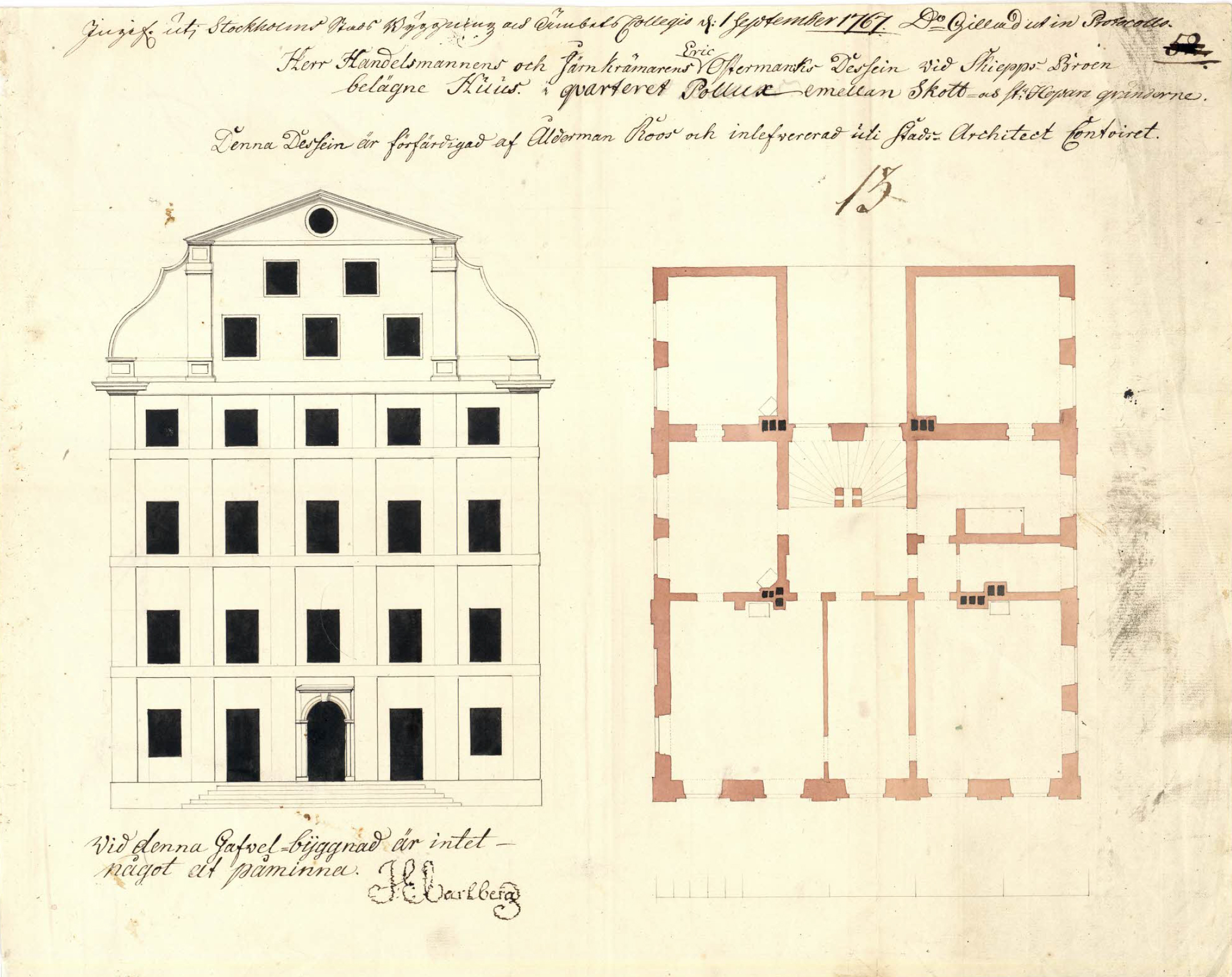
Building plan for the Hobelinska house from 1767, signed by Eberhard Carlberg.

Carlberg began work in 1700 at the fortification in Marstrand, working at first as a volunteer but later (11 January 1702 until 1703) as project leader. In 1703, Carlberg became a lieutenant in the Närkes and Värmlands reserve regiment (Swedish "tremänningsregementen"), participating in their field training in Latvia and Lithuania. In Gothenburg, Carlberg became a lieutenant at the fortification on 19 November 1709 and the city engineer on 14 September 1717. He resigned from the Gothenburg fortification with the rank of captain on 18 February 1721.

Carlberg took office on 27 April 1727 as a city architect in Stockholm, where he was responsible for the rebuilding of Slussen 1744–1753, the customs pavilions at Norrtull, the rebuilding of Alstavik on Långholmen, reconstruction of Danviken hospital, the church tower of Stockholm's Great Church, the reconstruction of the Bonde Palace and the Stora Sjötullen in Blockhusudden) in 1729. The Army's commissariat warehouse (1728–32 ) at Skeppsholmen is Carlberg's only fully preserved monumental building in Stockholm. As city architect, he issued regulations intended to promote harmonious appearance of neighboring buildings and also established a "school" to train young architects. His critics, while praising Carlberg's "force and vigor" warned that "If you put more iron into the fire than you have time to watch over, many will get burned." Erik Palmstedt was one of the students in Carlstadt's "school," which he entered when only 14 years old.

Johan Eberhard Carlberg owned and lived in a house he inherited from his mother at the eastern side of Korsgatan and Vallgatan's north side in Gothenburg. The Carlbergsgatan street in the district of Gårda in Gothenburg is named for the Carlberg family. In the district of Överkikaren at Hornsgatan 24 in Södermalm, he designed and built a residential building in 1731–32 as his private residence (see Johan Eberhard Carlbergs hus).

== Family ==
Carlberg's father Johan Carlberg (1638–1701) was bishop of Gothenburg 1689–1701. Carlberg himself married three times: first, on 24 June 1708 with Magdalena von Seth (1686–1717), second, on 25 May 1718 with Birgitta Thingvall (1699–1732), and third, in 1733 with his second wife's cousin Christina Engel Geijer (1713–1781).
