= Skeppsholmen =

One of the islands of Stockholm, Sweden

Coordinates: 59°19′33″N 18°05′03″E

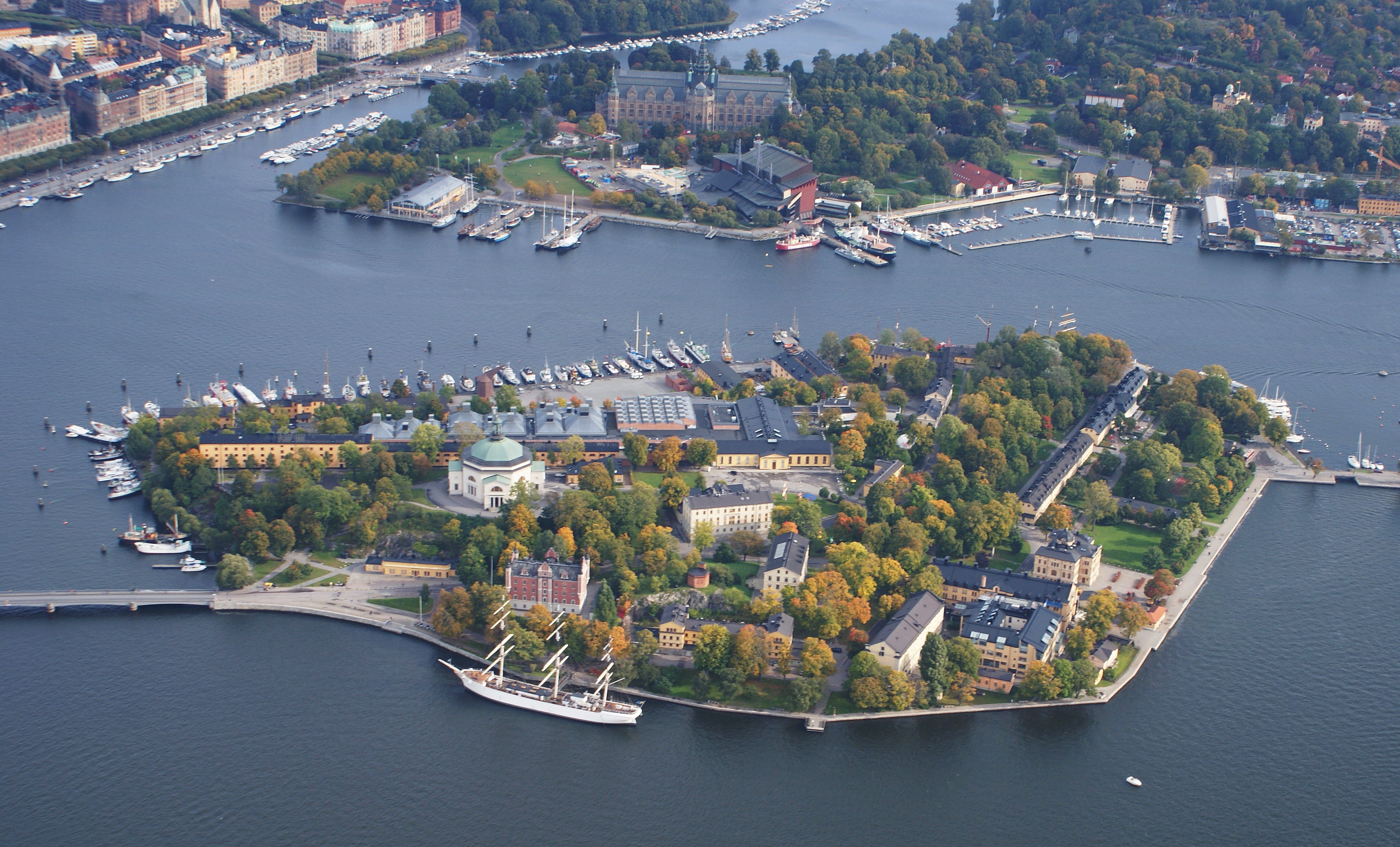
Aerial photo of Skeppsholmen, September 2012.

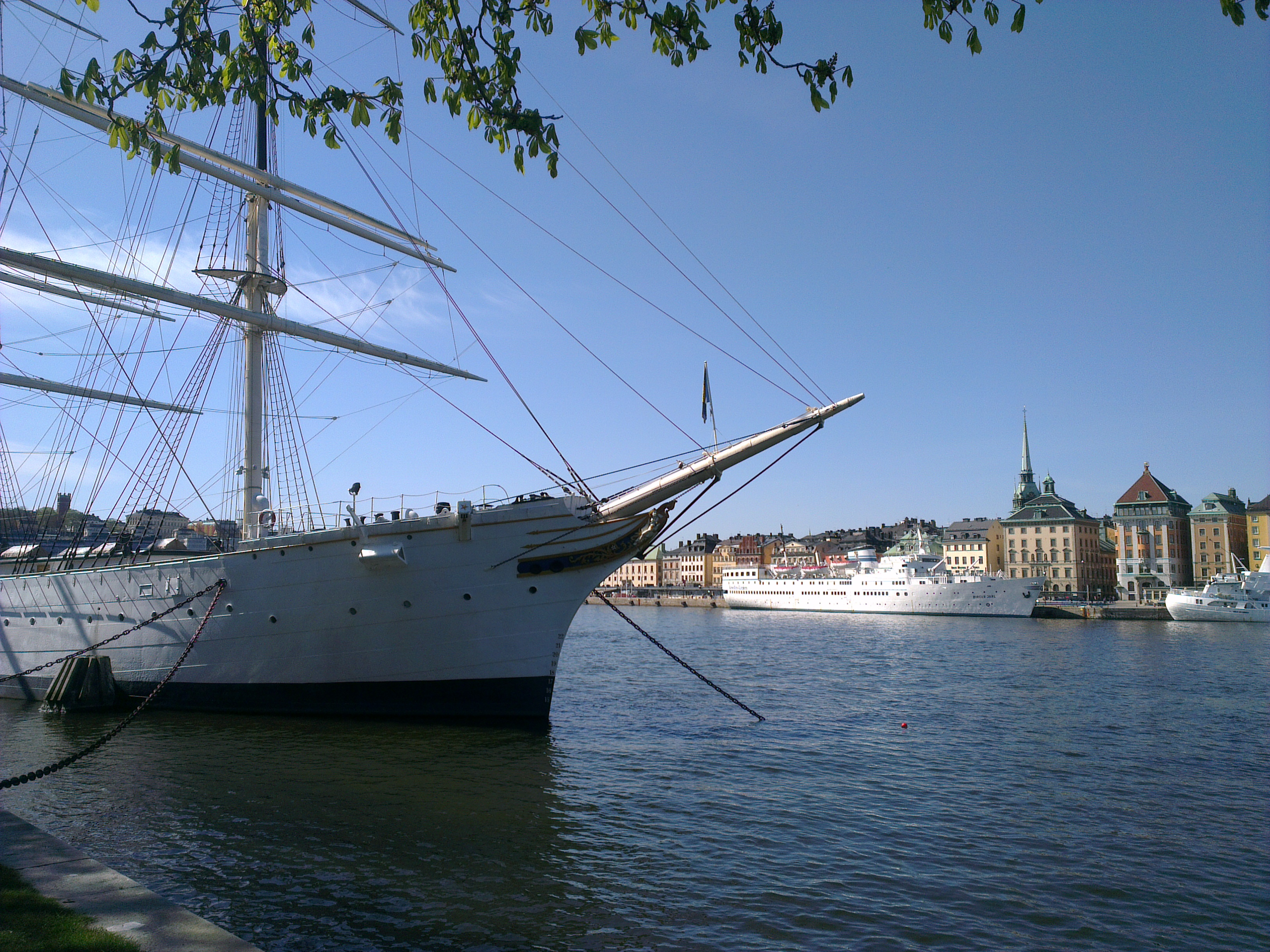
View from Skeppsholmen Island, September 2012.

Skeppsholmen (Ships' Islet) is one of the islands of Stockholm. It is connected with Blasieholmen and Kastellholmen by bridges. It is accessible by foot from Kungsträdgården, past the Grand Hôtel and Nationalmuseum, by bus number 65, or by boat from Slussen, Djurgården or Nybroplan.

Positioned strategically at the Baltic Sea entrance to Stockholm, it has traditionally been the location of several military buildings. Today, the military presence is low, and several museums can be found there instead, such as the Museum of Modern Art (Moderna museet), the main modern art museum of Stockholm, the architectural museum in the same building, and the East-Asian museum (Östasiatiska Muséet). It is also home to the Teater Galeasen. On the southern shore is the old sailing ship af Chapman which is now used as a youth hostel. Stockholm Jazz Festival is a popular annual summer event held on Skeppsholmen.

Eric Ericsonhallen (formerly Skeppsholmen Church) was the venue for an official dinner for foreign royalty, celebrating the Wedding of Victoria, Crown Princess of Sweden, and Daniel Westling in June 2010.

== See also ==
=== Buildings on Skeppsholmen ===
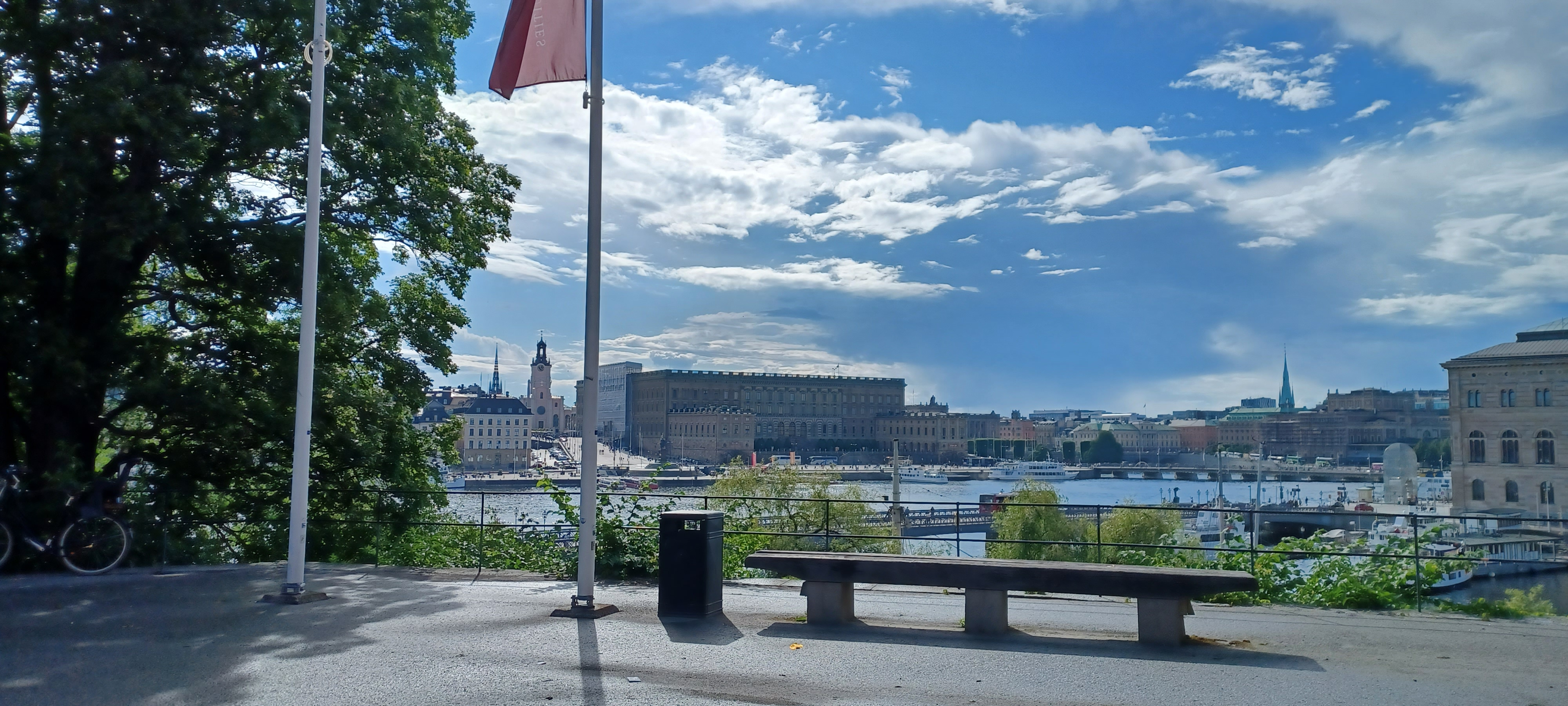
- View from Skeppsholmen to the royal palace Stockholm July 2023
  Admiralty House (Stockholm)
- Exercishuset
- Intendenturförrådet
- Långa raden
- Prästgården
- Sjökarteverket
- Royal Swedish Naval Academy
- Tyghuset

=== Bridges to Skeppsholmen ===
- Kastellholmsbron
- Skeppsholmsbron
