= Kastellholmen =

Coordinates: 59°19′20″N 18°05′22″E

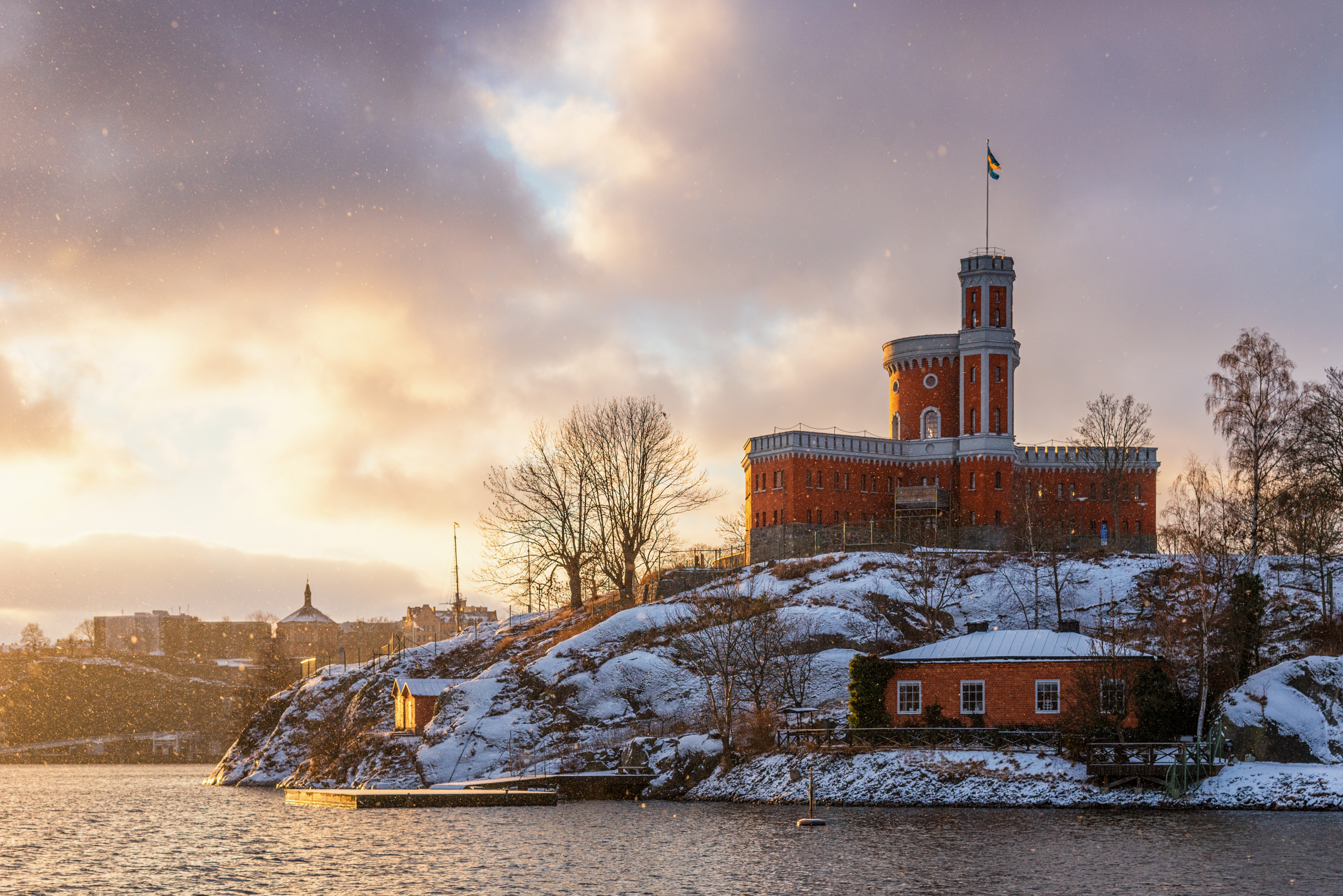
Kastellet Castle on Kastellholmen in 2016

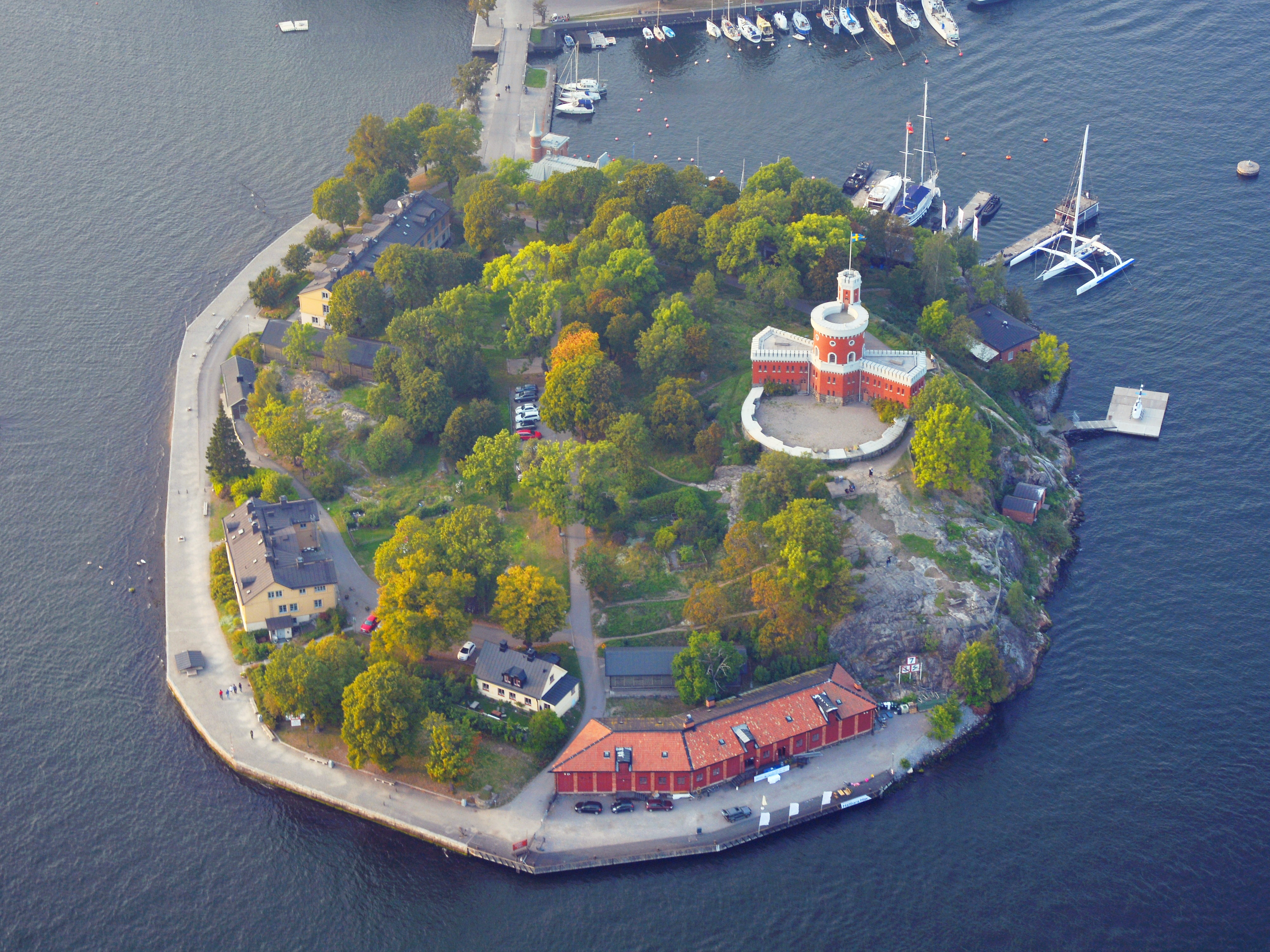
Aerial view of Kastellholmen

Kastellholmen (The Castle Isle) is an islet in the centre of Stockholm, Sweden. It belongs to the district of Skeppsholmen. It is connected to adjacent Skeppsholmen through the Kastellholmsbron bridge.

Kastellholmen has an area of 31,000 m^{2}. Kastellholmen has previously been known as Notholmen, Lilla Beckholmen and Skansholmen. On the island there is a small castle, Kastellet, which was built between 1846 and 1848 under design by Swedish officer and architect Fredrik Blom (1781–1853). Kastellholmen, like Skeppsholmen, has been managed by the Swedish National Property Agency since 1993 and is part of the Royal National City Park.

== See also ==
- Geography of Stockholm
- Beckholmen

== Other Sources ==
- Statens Fastighetsverk, nulägesbeskrivning Skeppsholmen-Kastellholmen, 2007. PDF 6,4 Mbyte.
- Statens fastighetsverk, Skeppsholmen-Kastellholmen, historik, 2007 PDF 4,7 Mbyte.
