= Blasieholmen =

Peninsula in Stockholm, Sweden

Coordinates: 59.3297°N 18.0769°E

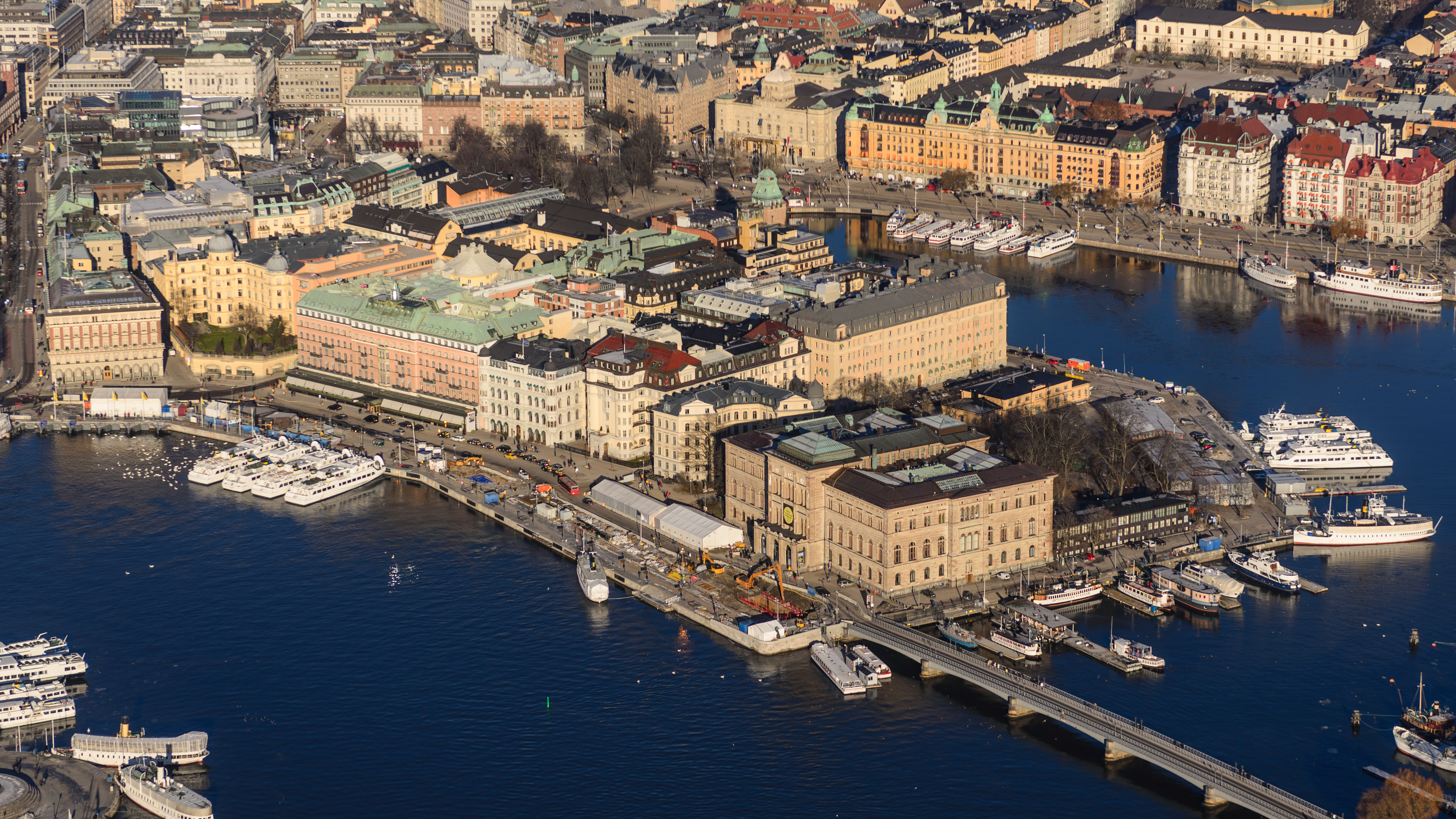
Blasieholmen in 2013.

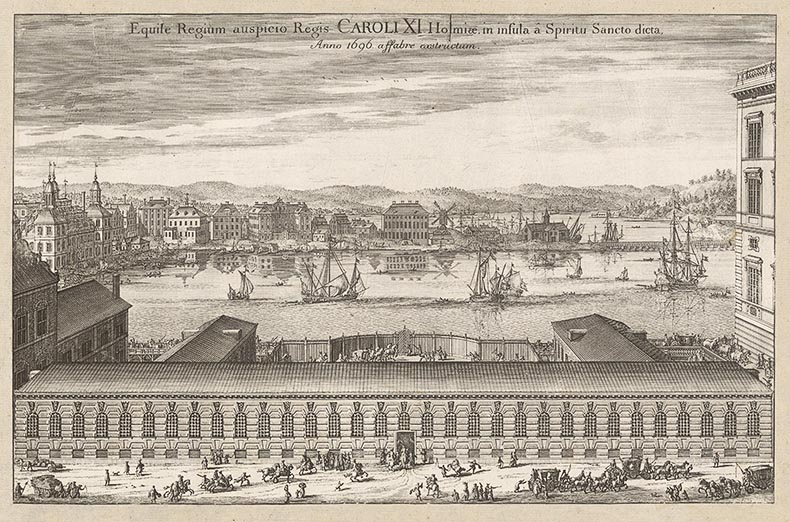
Blasieholmen viewed from Helgeandsholmen in 1696.

Blasieholmen is a peninsula in central Stockholm, Sweden. It is located east of Kungsträdgården. Originally a small island, named Käpplingen, it became a peninsula, connected to Norrmalm, during the 17th century. Among the buildings at Blasieholmen are the Nationalmuseum, hotels and office buildings. The Skeppsholmsbron bridge connects Blasieholmen to the island of Skeppsholmen. The Blasieholmen Church was demolished in 1964.
