= Sidsel Meineche Hansen =

London-based Danish visual artist (born 1981)

- Born: 1981 (age 44–45); Denmark
- Known for: Installation, Film, Image, Photography, Sculpture, VR and AR.
- Awards: Turner Prize, 2020

Sidsel Meineche Hansen (born 1981, Denmark) is a visual artist based in London.

== Biography ==
Their work explores "virtual and robotic bodies and their relationship to human labour within the gaming, pornographic and tech-industries", and includes pieces in materials as varied as wood, clay, metal, wood cuts, textiles, CGI animation and video. They were one of ten artists selected for the £10,000 bursary which was awarded in lieu of the usual Turner Prize in 2020, as the judges adapted the prize in light of impacts of the coronavirus pandemic. The other recipients were Arika, Liz Johnson Artur, Oreet Ashery, Shawanda Corbett, Jamie Crewe, Sean Edwards, Ima-Abasi Okon, Imran Perretta and Alberta Whittle. Hansen was selected for "innovative use of VR and AR" in the shows An Artist's Guide to Stop Being An Artist (2019) and Welcome to End-Used City (2019).

== Selected works and exhibitions ==
In October - November 2014 Meineche Hansen had a solo exhibition at Cubitt Gallery, London. INSIDER collected works that "reflect[ed] on self-destruction and mutation".

In March–May 2016 gasworks London hosted Meineche Hansen's solo show SECOND SEX WAR. Included in the show was a piece made by Meineche Hansen, Manuela Gernedel, Alan Michael, Georgie Nettell, Oliver Rees, Matthew Richardson, Gili Tal and Lena Tutunjian, called CULTURAL CAPITAL COOPERATIVE OBJECT #1 (2016), which the artists called "an attempt to congeal the group's cultural capital into a cooperatively owned object".

Real Doll Theatre was a solo show at KW, Berlin, in 2018. The show included "collaborative works with filmmaker Therese Henningsen and musicians Asger, and Holger Hartvig, as well as a live set by the London-based Music project Ectopia of Adam Christensen, Jack Brennan and Viki Steiri".

Work by Meineche Hansen was included in the 2019 ArkDes Stockholm iteration of the Cruising Pavilion: Architecture, Gay Sex and Cruising Culture project, which was initiated at the Venice Biennale in 2018.

An Artist's Guide to Stop Being An Artist was installed at SMK/ National Gallery of Denmark, in 2019. The show included the "life-sized ball-jointed figure with orifices that were compatible with oral and vaginal inserts made in silicone, which are sold for current sex robots on the market", Difficult to work with? (2019).

Chisenhale Gallery hosted Meineche Hansen's solo show Welcome to End-Used City, displaying existing and newly-commissioned work in 2019. The exhibition included the participatory installation End-Used City (2019), which participants could control with an Xbox handset, partly inspired by the seventeenth-century frontispiece by Abraham Bosse in Thomas Hobbes's philosophical treatise Leviathan. It included the work Hellmouth (To Madame) (2018), which Flash magazine called a "gendered theological device". Writing in Mousse magazine, India Nielsen notes that Meineche Hansen's work "visualize[s] the invisible, internalized structures of surveillance capitalism, highlighting the slippery trade-off between desiring something and becoming subject to it". The show was highlighted by the 2020 Turner Prize judges for its use of VR and AR.

In October–December 2020 Meineche Hansen's solo show home vs owner was installed at Rodeo gallery, London.

== Links ==
Artist's website, labourpower http://www.labourpower.co.uk/
