= Nautical Chart Department (Sweden) =

Building in Stockholm, Sweden

Coordinates: 59°19′30″N 18°04′56″E

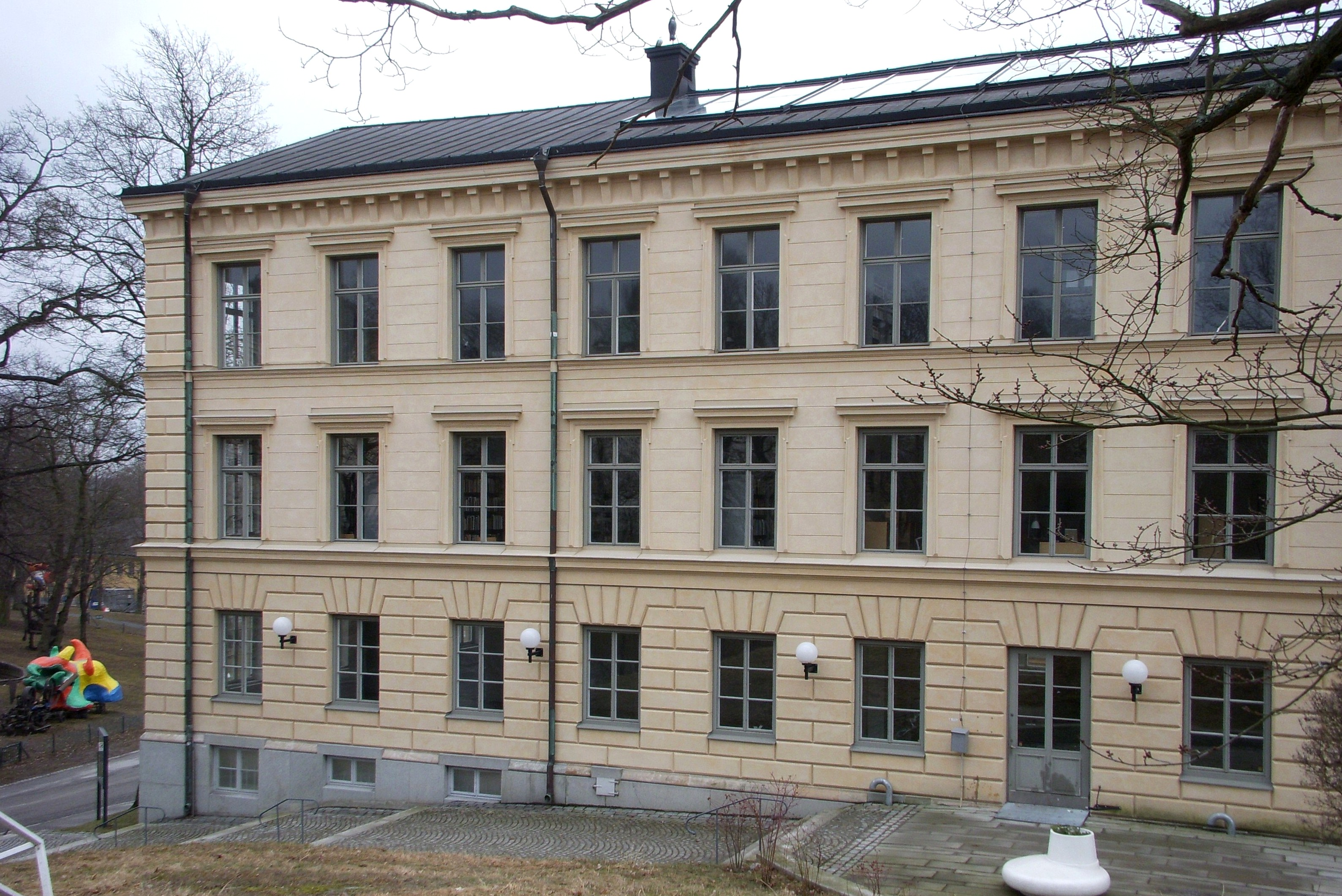
Sjökarteverket on Skeppsholmen

The Nautical Chart Department (Swedish: Sjökarteverket) is a building located on the islet Skeppsholmen in central Stockholm, Sweden.

Built in 1871–1872 to the plans of Victor Ringheim, head of the Engineering Department and successor of Fredrik Blom, this building was originally a well-proportioned two-storey structure, in 1910 heightened with one floor, and in 1937-1938 lengthened with three window rows. The building replaced a small log house on the site, for long, 1747–1861, known all over town as the tavern Tuppen ("The Rooster") and praised by Carl Michael Bellman in his 67th epistle. The department, originally located on Riddarholmen, used the building to store the partly secret nautical charts before a various shipping departments were gathered under one body, the Swedish Maritime Administration in 1956, and the scattered institutions physically united under a single roof on Gärdet in 1965. The building then housed the Museum of Architecture during the period 1966–1993, to serve the architecture department of the school of fine arts, before accommodating Designforum Svensk Form, an exposition space promoting Swedish design from 2005.

== See also ==
- History of Stockholm
