= Jonas Lidströmer =

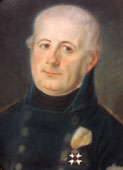
Jonas Lidströmer (1755–1808) was a Swedish inventor and officer in the Swedish Navy. Lidströmer was born in 1755 at Lagfors bruk, Medelpad, and died 1808 in Stockholm. He was a colonel-mecanicus, head of the mechanical state of the Royal Swedish Navy, Royal Inventor and advisor to the king, Knight of the Order of Vasa and eventually knighted Lidströmer (he was previously called Lidström).

== Biography ==
He was the son of Jonas Lidström the Elder, (born 1713), and began his studies at Uppsala University in spring 1771.

Jonas Lidströmer has often been called Sweden's "mechanical genius" and is occasionally compared with Christopher Polhem, another notable Swedish inventor. He collaborated with Fredrik Henrik af Chapman and went to Karlskrona with his help, the main base of the Swedish navy at the time. He also collaborated with the artists Johan Tobias Sergel, Louis Jean Desprez and Ehrensvärd, and a letter correspondence with Carl Christopher Gjörwell has been preserved. The later well-renowned royal architect Fredrik Blom was one of Lidströmer's apprentices.

He is primarily famous for the Obelisk at Slottsbacken adjacent to the Stockholm Palace and the construction of Norrbro – the bridge between the Royal Palace and the Opera in Stockholm – he was the architect for the southern part, but leader of the construction of the northern part as well. Lidströmer also erected the statue of King Gustav III with its pedestal and remodelled the quay building at Slottsbacken. He also designed, constructed and built the famous Old Mast Crane at the naval harbour in Karlskrona.

Lidströmer also constructed a series of harbours in Sweden and Finland and improved the harbours of Gothenburg, Karlskrona and Helsingborg.

He was the head of the Mechanical School in Karlskrona, the most qualified technical institute at the time. He is credited with a number of mechanical devices and innovations, such as a horse-drawn grinding machine and lathe, new methods of moulding, and compasses.

Lidströmer was the president of the Royal Swedish Academy of Sciences (of which he was a member from 1805), and member of several other academies such as the Royal Swedish Academy of Arts and the Royal Swedish Academy of War Sciences. He was Knight of the Royal Order of Vasa. Several models and drawings of his work are present at a number of museums such as the Maritime Museum and the Swedish Centre for Architecture and Design in Stockholm, and the Marinmuseum in Karlskrona.

He married Elisabeth Öhman and had six children. Two daughters and two sons survived to adulthood. His younger surviving son, Johan Nikolaus Lidströmer, who inherited the Allatorp property outside Karlskrona in Blekinge, had children, but no grandchildren. Jonas Lidströmer's oldest surviving son, Fredrik August Lidströmer (1787–1856) was Stockholm's City Architect and passed the name further to his oldest son Otto August Lidströmer, businessman in Stockholm. The younger son, Fredrik Lidströmer, who was an officer in the former Swedish colony of Saint Barthélemy in the Caribbean did, however, not have any children. Otto August Lidströmer alone passed the name further to his only son Gustaf Lidströmer, a lawyer whose sister Sigrid Lidströmer did not have any children, who in turn passed it to his only child Jonas (II) Lidströmer, a lawyer.
