= Rosendal Palace =

Building in central Stockholm, Sweden

Coordinates: 59°19′44″N 18°07′06″E

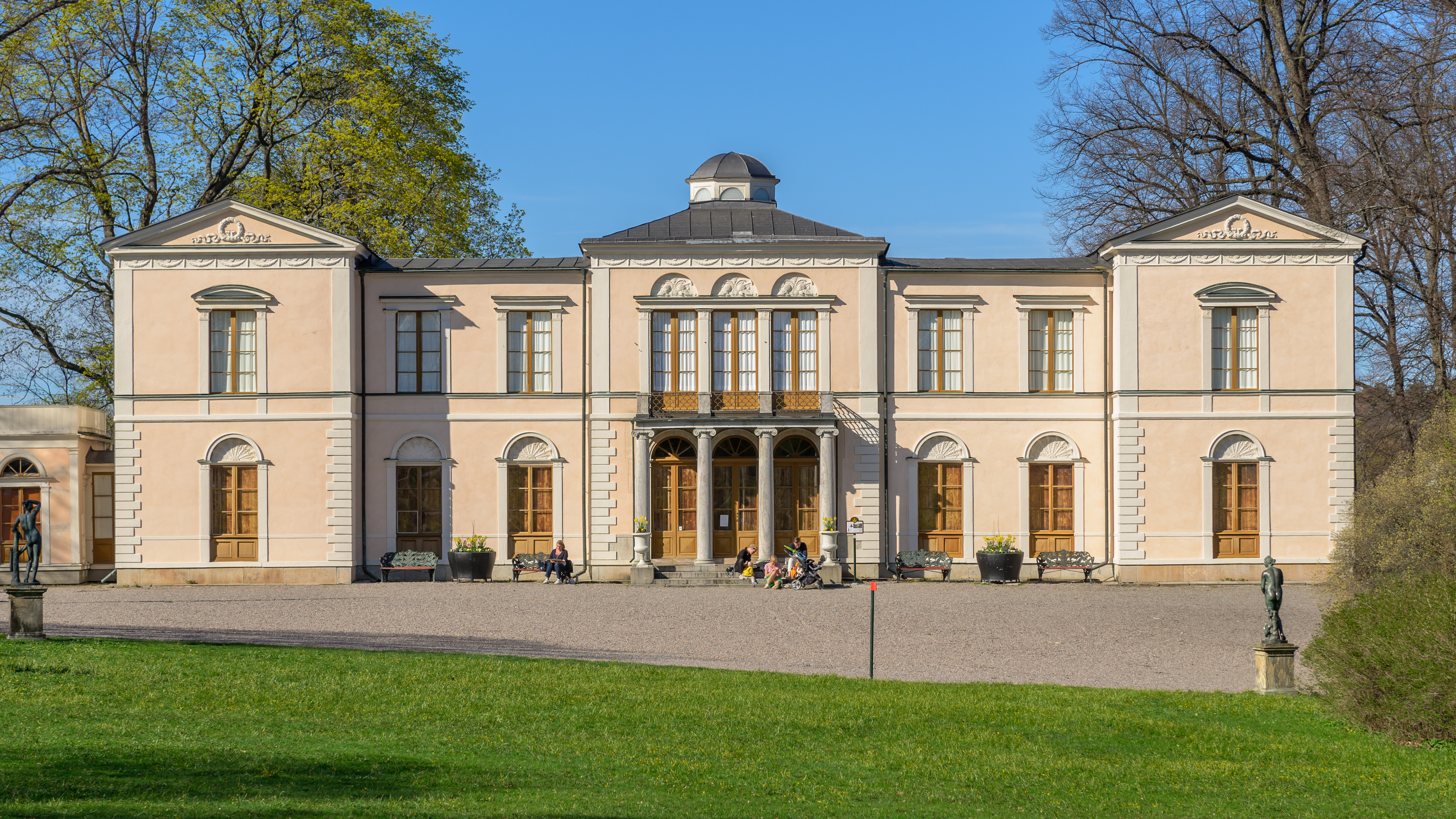
Rosendal Palace.

Rosendal Palace (Swedish: Rosendals slott) is a Swedish palace pavilion located on Djurgården, an island in central Stockholm. It was built between 1823 and 1827 for King Charles XIV John, the first Bernadotte king of Sweden.

== History ==
Rosendal Palace was largely designed by Fredrik Blom, one of the leading architects of the time, who received a royal commission to draw and build the palace building after the original buildings burned down. Fredrik August Lidströmer, Stockholm's City Architect from 1818 to 1824, had been King Charles XIV's primary architect at the construction of the original Rosendal Palace. After it burned down in 1819, Lidströmer also created the initial drawings for the replacement palace. These were then adapted and redrawn by Fredrik Blom, who had been an assistant to Jonas Lidströmer.

After the death of Karl XIV Johan in 1844, the palace was used and changed by future generations of the royal family. For example, a two-story veranda was built on the northern side of the palace. Oscar II had the dining room wing decorated as an armory and the rooms decorated in accordance with late 19th-century interior design ideas. These changes were largely removed when the palace opened to the public. On the initiative of Prince Eugen and under the leadership of superintendent John Böttiger, the palace's interiors were recreated for the opening of the Rosendal Palace Museum in 1913. The palace, which has been open to the public during the summers since then, is a museum of Karl XIV Johan and his time. The museum shows the interior design taste of the 1820s and 1830s – the style that is usually called the Karl-Johans style . Sights include the library where Karl XIV Johan's book collection has been preserved in pristine condition and the interior of Karl XIV Johan's bedchamber, which was moved from the Royal Palace to Rosendal in 1913.

Rosendal Castle has been a state monument since 21 January 1935 and is managed by the Royal Djurgården Administration . The castle's movable furnishings are cared for and maintained by the Royal Household Cabinet .

The palace stands today largely as it did in Charles XIV John's lifetime. During the summer months the palace is open to visitors for guided tours. Prince Carl Philip, Duke of Varmland and his wife Princess Sofia lived at Rosendal Palace between 2015 and 2017 while their permanent home, Villa Solbacken, was being renovated.

== See also ==
- Architecture of Stockholm
