= Cruising Pavilion =

Architecture exhibition

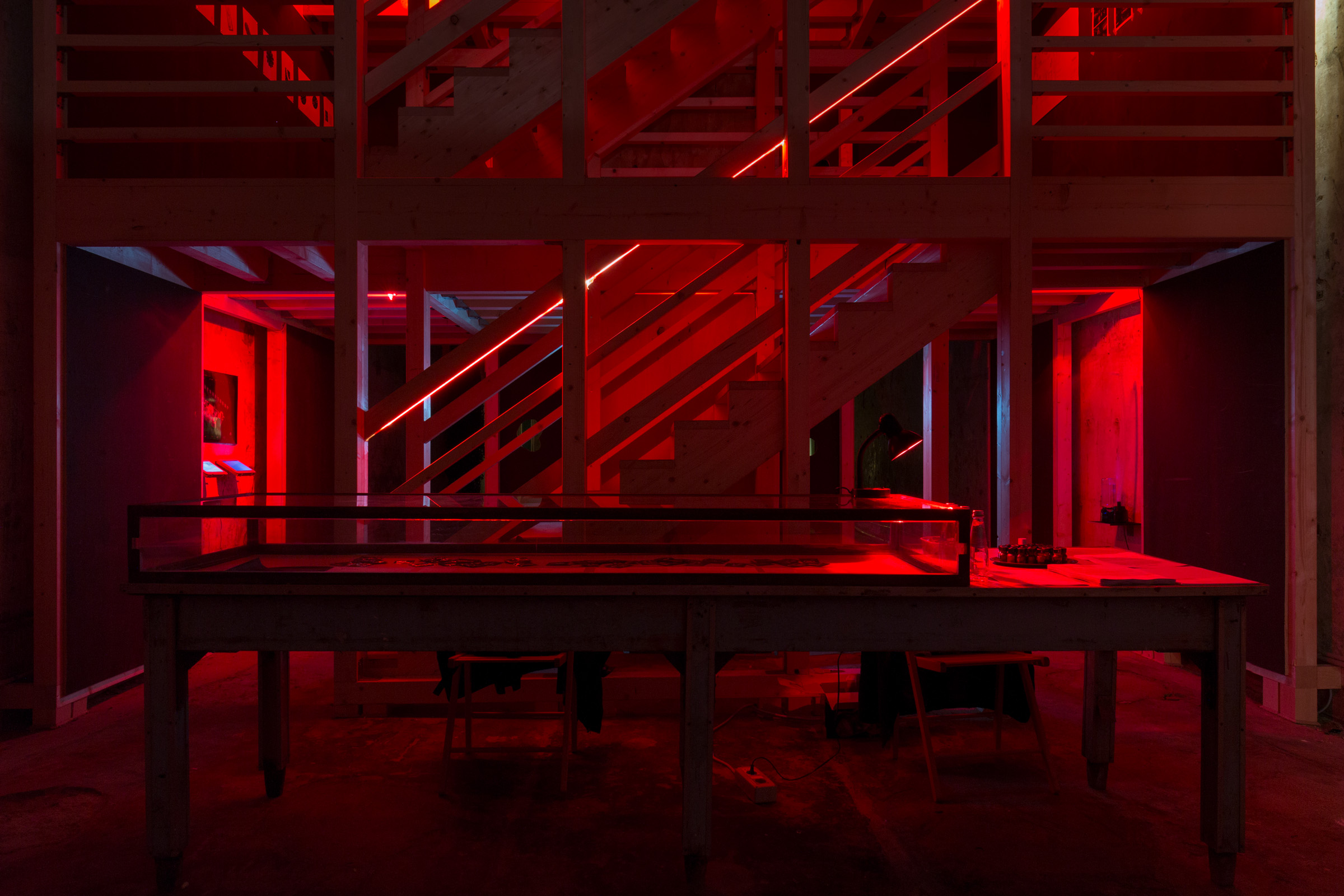
The Cruising Pavilion art exhibition from the Venice Biennale of Architecture, 2018

Cruising Pavilion was an art and architecture exhibition that explored the places and practices of casual sex. It was an unofficial offering of the 16th Venice Biennale of Architecture and ran from 24 May to 1 July, 2018. Between 22 February and 7 April 2019, the second edition opened at Ludlow 38 in New York City. In late 2019, the final chapter of the project opened at ArkDes, the Swedish Centre for Architecture and Design, in Stockholm and ran from 20 September to 10 November, 2019.

== Exhibition ==
The exhibit in Venice sought to depict places where gay men historically looked for casual sex and hookups, including "non-conventional venues such as parking lots, parks, bathroom stalls, and dark rooms." The design of the exhibition included glory holes, a semblance of dark rooms, and aspects seeking to demonstrate aspects of hooking-up including narrow stairs and multiple levels. The show presented ways LGBT people "have shaped space and the ways in which architecture has therefore in turn shaped space for them." Cruising as a practice and the spaces in which it happens were explored and made safe in the exhibition, all while challenging the heteronormativity commonly expressed in the Venice Biennale of Architecture itself. This is especially dramatic given the implications of online and dating apps such as Grindr.

The exhibition in New York explored the different directions by which cruising practices have evolved. The exhibition in Stockholm, which took place in a national gallery, explored the intersection of cruising and architectural environments. According to critic Michael Bullock, "in a little less than two years, [Cruising Pavilion] has gone from a renegade operation to an institutionalized project shown in a national museum, though ironically it found its most distinguished venue in a city of 2.4 million people with only one official gay bar."

== Artists ==
- Cruising Pavilion in Venice, was curated by Pierre-Alexandre Mateos, Rasmus Myrup, Octave Perrault and Charles Teyssou. The curators self-funded the exhibition to confront this LGBT subculture that had not been explored through architecture. Installations included works by Alison Veit, Andreas Angelidakis, Andrés Jaque / Office for Political Innovation, Atelier Aziz Alqatami, Carlos Reyes, Diller Scofidio + Renfro, DYKE_ON, Etienne Descloux, Hannah Quinlan & Rosie Hastings, Henrik Olesen, Ian Wooldridge, S H U Í (Jon Wang & Sean Roland), Lili Reynaud Dewar, Pascal Cribier & Louis Benech, Monica Bonvicini, Studio Karhard, Studio Odile Decq, Özgür Kar, Pol Esteve & Marc Navarro, Prem Sahib, Tom Burr, Trevor Yeung.
- Cruising Pavilion in New York City, featured works by Ann Krsul, Amy Cappellazzo, Alexis Roworth, Sarah Drake, Carlos Reyes, Charles Terrell, DeSe Escobar, Horace Gifford, John Lindell, Jürgen Mayer H., Kayode Ojo, Madelon Vriesendorp, Maud Escudié, Philipp Timischl, Robert Getso, Robert Yang, Shu Lea Cheang, Nguyen Tan Hoang, Victoria Colmegna.
- Cruising Pavilion: Architecture, Gay Sex and Cruising Culture in Stockholm, included works by Andreas Angelidakis, Monica Bonvicini, Tom Burr, Shu Lea Cheang, Victoria Colmegna, Earl Combs, Steve Ostrow, Etienne Descloux, Diller Scofidio + Renfro, DYKE_ON, Pol Esteve, Marc Navarro, General Idea, Robert Getso, Horace Gifford, Sidsel Meineche Hansen, Nguyen Tan Hoang, Andrés Jaque, Studio Karhard, Ann Krsul, Amy Cappellazzo, Alexis Roworth, Sarah Drake, John Lindell, Henrik Olesen, Puppies Puppies, Hannah Quinlan, Rosie Hastings, Carlos Reyes, Prem Sahib, Jaanus Samma, SHUI, Treasure Island Media, Charles Terrell, Bruce Mailman, Tommy Ting, Madelon Vriesendorp, Steven Warwick, Robert Yang, Trevor Yeung.
