= Fredrik August Lidströmer =

Swedish architect (1787–1856)

Fredrik August Lidströmer (1787-1856)

Fredrik August Lidströmer (1787–1856) was the son of Jonas Lidströmer. He was a Swedish architect, artist and marine officer, as well as Stockholm's city architect. Raised in the naval city of Karlskrona, he came to Stockholm to help his father with the construction of the Obelisk at Slottsbacken adjacent to the royal palace, and then continued with the construction of the quays surrounding the waters of the city. He is the architect of Stockholm's oldest official park, the Strömparterren, situated between the Royal Palace in Stockholm and the Opera House, just opposite the current parliament building.

After a short career, he joined King Charles XIV John's officers and became his first architect for the construction of the original Rosendal Palace, which burned down in 1819. He designed the pedestal and stonework for the statue of Charles XIII in Kungsträdgården (the Royal Garden), located in Stockholm, and was the city architect between 1818 and 1824. At the order of the king, he was also responsible for transport and placement of the large porphyry vase at the Rosendal palace.

He also drew the blueprints for the new Rosendal palace, which was to a great deal followed by the work of Fredrik Blom. The Queen's pavilion, Drottningpaviljongen, at the present Rosendal palace is entirely the work of Fredrik August Lidströmer, however. The guard's cottage of Vaktstugan is as well.

Lidströmer also worked under Baltzar von Platen on the construction of the Göta Canal, which connects Sweden's east and west coasts. He also constructed Visby Hospital on Gotland and the prison of Länsfängelset in Nyköping. His last works were the quays of Nybroviken, where Strandvägen meet the Royal Dramatic Theatre in central Stockholm.

He reached the rank of lieutenant colonel mechanicus, a military officer with engineering tasks, and was made a knight in the Order of Vasa, like his father. His work, including work in gouache and watercolor and original drawings, has been preserved in several archives as well as at the Nationalmuseum in Stockholm.
