= Louise Lidströmer =

Swedish artist (born 1948)

Ego, Self-portrait by L Lidströmer, oil on canvas 60 x 60 cm, 1987

Louise (L) Lidströmer (born 9 July 1948, in Vienna) is a Swedish artist who studied at the Royal Swedish Academy of Arts in Stockholm 1967–72. She works with paintings, sculpture and object installation, and has presented large series of exhibitions in and outside Sweden.

The installation "Tabula Rasa" at Stockholm Art Fair 1994 attracted a lot of attention. Instead of "hommage" she has created the concept "femmage"(a female celebration). (Note: The word "femmage," has been used: from the 1970s onwards by the artists Miriam Schapiro and Melissa Meyer (through merging 'feminine' and 'collage') to denote the activities of collage, assemblage, découpage and photomontage practised by women using "traditional women's techniques – sewing, piercing, hooking, cutting, appliquéing, cooking and the like …"; by the artist Louise Lidströmer, beginning circa 1994, with regard to a series of her paintings with this title, to mean a female celebration, tribute, or "homage paid by a woman"; or, more generally and particularly in French, to mean "homage paid to a woman.") Series of femmages to e.g. Camille Claudel and to Titian have been shown and have attracted attention in Sweden, but also in Paris (Centre Culturel Suédois), Mons in Belgium (Musée des Beaux Arts) and Rome (Istituto Svedese). Louise Lidströmer has signed her paintings with "Ljubi" until 1996, L² for sculptures and "L. Lidströmer" for paintings from 1996.

== Selected solo exhibitions ==
- VIDA Museum, Öland (2003), 2007)
- Karlskrona Art Hall (2005)
- Konstruktiv Tendens, Stockholm (2004, 2000)
- Mora Kulturhus (2002)
- Galerie Bruno Delarue, Paris (2002)
- Norreport, Halmstad (2000)
- Kamras Gallery, Borgholm (1999)
- Kalmar Museum (1998)
- Istituto Svedese di Studi Classici, Rome (1998)
- Galerie Magda Danysz, Paris (1998)
- Musée des Beaux Arts, Mons, Belgium (1997)
- Centre Culturel Suédois, Paris (1997)
- Södertälje Town Hall (1996)
- Museum of Alingsås (1995)
- Leufsta bruk (1995)
- Konstkammaren, Umeå (1995)
- Ann Westin Gallery, Stockholm (1994)
- Astley Gallery, Uttersberg (1994)
- Tabula Rasa, Stockholm Art Fair (1994)
- Doktor Glas Gallery, Stockholm (1994)
- Lidingö Town Hall (1985, 1990, 1994)
- Franciska Gallery, Århus, Denmark (1993)
- Annes hus, Millesgården, Lidingö (1992)
- Cité internationale des arts in Paris (1991)

== Selected group exhibitions ==
- FIDEM, Seixal, Lissabon, Portugal (2004)
- Monumentala sötsaker, Konstnärshuset (2004)
- Swedish participant in FIDEM, Kungliga Myntkabinettet (2003)
- FIDEM, La Monnaie de Paris (2002)
- Gold in Art, Castle of Borgholm (2001)
- Meeting with Tizian, Churches, Lidingö (2001)
- Sveriges Allmänna Konstförening (2000–2004)
- Samling, Konstruktiv Tendens, Stockholm (1999–2004)
- Itineraire, Ville de Levallois, Paris (1998)
- Expo Coll., Cité Internat. des Arts, Paris (1998, 1997)
- Expo Bleu, Galerie Magda Danysz, Paris (1997)
- Graphic Biennal, Bhopal, India (1992)

== Selected literature ==
- Art Diary International, Milano, Giancarlo Politi Editore, 1996–. ISBN 88-7816-026-1
- Cavalli-Björkman, Görel, and Ljubi Lidströmer. Femmage à Tizian. Stockholm: Edition Ann Westin, 1994. ISBN 91-630-3596-0. Parallel texts in Swedish and English.
- Contemporary Art Print of the World., Hong Kong, 1988. (ISBN...)
- De Geer, Renate. Sex kvinnliga Lidingökonstnärer (Six Female Artists from Lidingö), 1983. (Booklet, no ISBN.)
- Engman, Anders. Konst på Andersen. Stockholm: Andersen, 2001. (Booklet, no ISBN.)
- Itineraire 98, Ville de Levalois Paris, 1998 (Expo catalog, no ISBN)
- Konstnärer i Stockholm (Artists in Stockholm). 1980– (ISBN...)
- Stare, Jacqueline. Ljubi Lidströmer. [Stockholm]: [L. Lidströmer], 1990. ISBN 91-630-0214-0.
- Svenska konstnärer – biografisk handbok (Swedish Artists – a Biographical Handbook). Stockholm, Nybloms förlag, 1982–. ISBN 91-85040-84-3
- Urwitz, Monica, et al. Konstruktiv Tendens 25. Stockholm: Konstruktiv tendens, 2006. ISBN 978-91-631-9867-0. Parallel texts in Swedish and English.
- Vem är hon : kvinnor i Sverige – biografisk uppslagsbok (Who is She: Women in Sweden – a Biographical Dictionary). Stockholm, Norstedts, 1988. ISBN 91-1-863422-2.
