= Lidströmer =

- Noble family
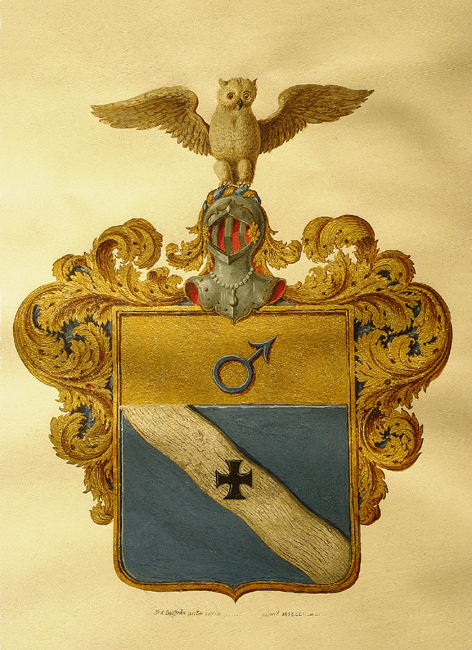
- Country: Sweden
- Founded: 1800; 226 years ago
- Founder: Jonas Lidströmer
- Current head: Niklas Lidströmer
- Members: Jonas Lidströmer; Fredrik August Lidströmer; Sigrid Lidströmer; Louise Lidströmer

Lidströmer is a Swedish noble family, originating from the village of Liden, Medelpad, Sweden. Knighted on 3 October 1800 by King Gustav IV Adolf in Stockholm Palace, Sweden. Jonas Lidströmer (1755–1808) was nobilised on the grounds of his great innovations during late 18th century

Eldest paternal progenitor is Nils Aronsson (164(6)–1701) from Boda in Liden, Västernorrland County. His great grandson, was the lieutenant colonel 'mekanikus', head of the Swedish Navy's 'mechanical estate' (the highest engineering education at the time) in Sweden and preses in the Royal Swedish Academy of Sciences Jonas Lidströmer.

== Notable members ==
- Jonas Lidströmer (1755–1808), inventor
- Anna Fredrika Lidströmer (1780-1861), spouse of Admiral Otto Gustaf Nordenskiöld
- Fredrik August Lidströmer (1787–1856), architect
- Fredrik Lidströmer (1820-1863), officer at the Swedish colony of Saint Barthélemy
- August Lidströmer (1839–1915), businessman
- Gustaf Lidströmer (1871–1944), county councillor
- Sigrid Lidströmer (1866–1942), author
- Louise Lidströmer (b. 1948), artist

== Blazon ==
"...A shield, in the upper part (a chief) of gold, displaying a blue symbol of Mars. In the lower part of the shield, which is blue, a silver bend runs diagonally from the top right to the bottom left corner, overlaid with a black cross. The open barred helmet is crowned with a wreath twisted of gold and blue, upon which rests a forward-facing owl with outstretched wings, in its natural colours. The mantling is gold on the outside and blue on the inside, as shown with its proper and true colors in this depiction of the arms."
