= Sigrid Lidströmer =

Swedish author, polemicist and translator

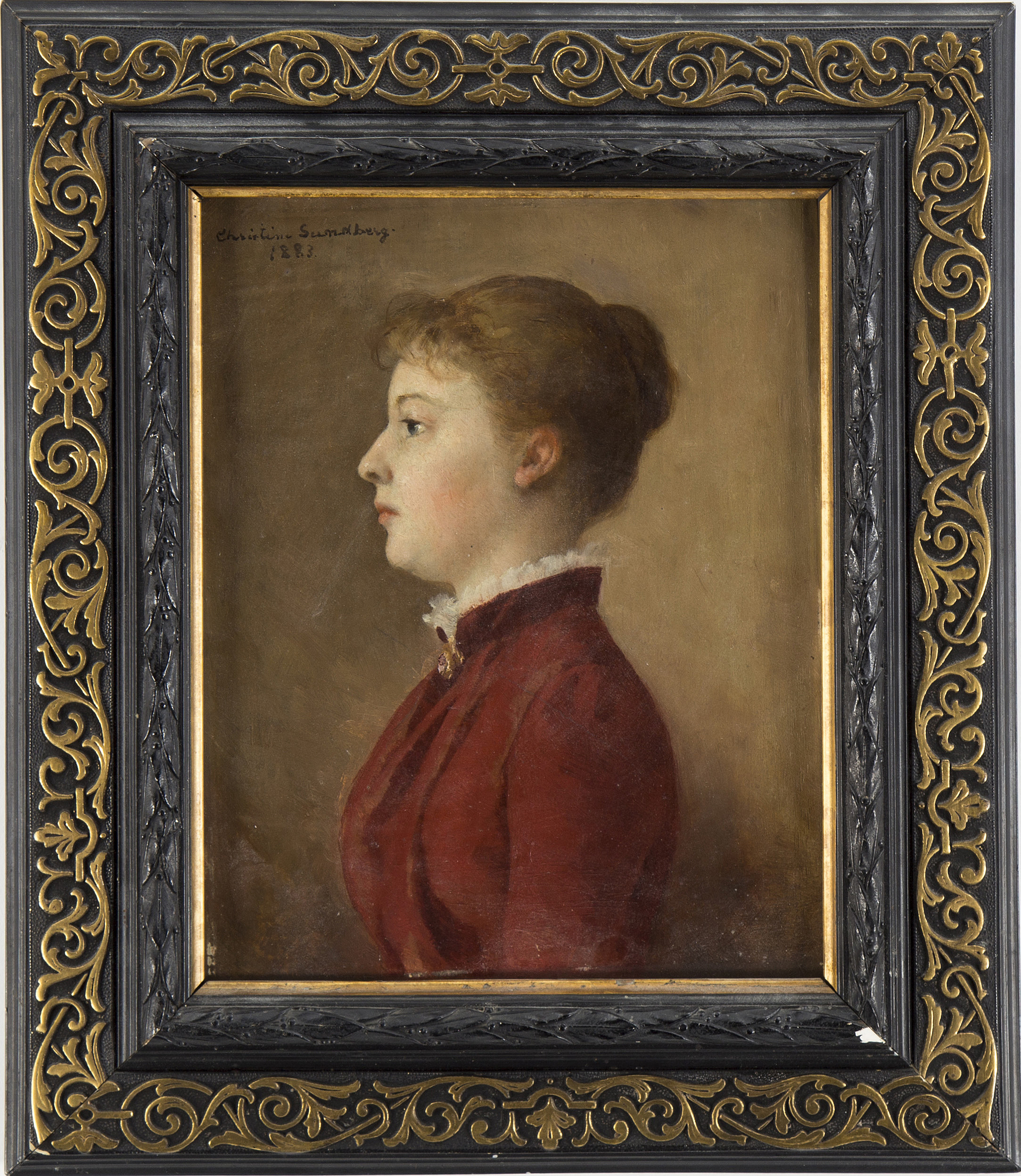
Sigrid Lidströmer (1866-1942), portrayed by Christine Sundberg (Swedish painter) 1837 - 1892, oil on panel, signed and dated 1883.

Sigrid Lidströmer (1866–1942), granddaughter of the architect Fredrik August Lidströmer, was a Swedish author, polemicist and translator. She wrote articles in the Swedish literary magazine Idun, wrote and translated songs, novels, short stories, polemical articles, and poems from and to Swedish, Finnish, Norwegian, Danish, German, French and English.

She corresponded with Oscar Wilde and translated his The Ballad of Reading Gaol into Swedish.

Her main interests were women's rights, education, literary debate and general human rights.
