= Liden =

- Liden Old Church, constructed in 1480

- Location within Västernorrland Location within Sweden
- Coordinates: 62°43′N 16°48′E
- Country: Sweden
- Province: Medelpad
- County: Västernorrland County
- Municipality: Sundsvall Municipality

Area
  - Total: 0.65 km^{2} (0.25 sq mi)

Population (31 December 2010)
  - Total: 254
  - Density: 392/km^{2} (1,020/sq mi)
- Time zone: UTC+1 (CET)
  - Summer (DST): UTC+2 (CEST)

Liden is a locality situated in Sundsvall Municipality, Västernorrland County, Sweden with 254 inhabitants in 2010.

It is located near the river Indalsälven, 50 km (road 86) north west of the city of Sundsvall.

The name Liden (Swedish; meaning "a long slope", down to the river) was first recorded as De Lidh in a letter from 1344, Liden's Old Church was built in the 1480s by the Dominican friar Josefhus.

The Swedish noble family Lidströmer originates from Liden. Pentathlete and Olympian Gustaf Lindh, only winner of the winter pentathlon at the 1948 Winter Olympics, was born in Liden.

The New Church, which was consecrated in 1858, is situated a few hundred meters above the Old Church.
