= Kieran Long =

British journalist and curator

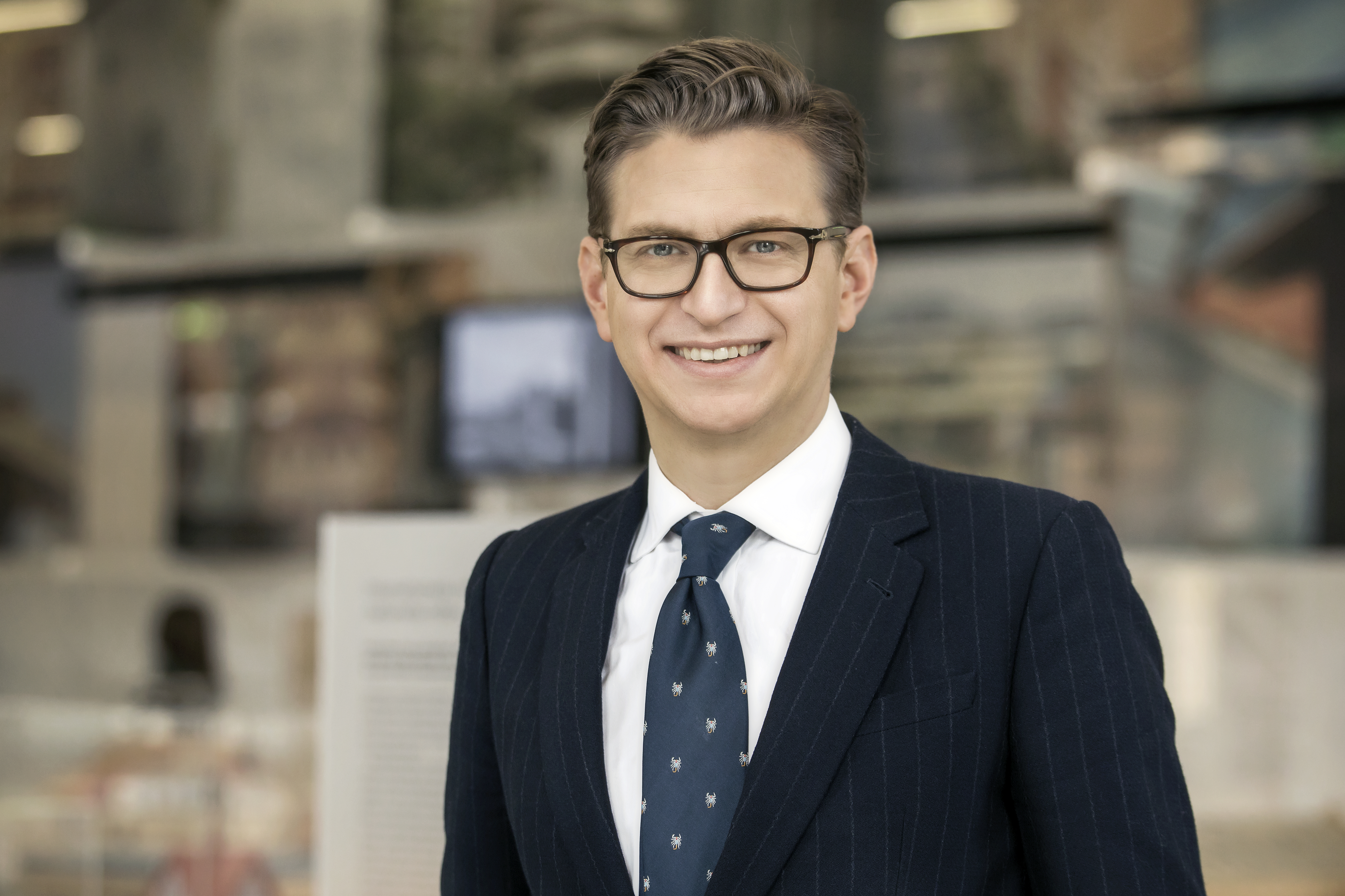
- Born: August 19, 1977 (age 49)
- Citizenship: British, Swedish
- Education: Cardiff University (BA)
- Title: Journalist, curator and museum director

Kieran Long (born 19 August 1977) is a British journalist, curator and museum director specializing in architecture and design. He is the director and CEO of Amos Rex, a contemporary art museum in Helsinki, Finland.

Previously, he served as director of ArkDes, Sweden’s national museum of architecture and design (2017–2024), and as the Keeper of Design, Architecture, and Digital at the Victoria and Albert Museum (2012–2017).

Long has also worked as a journalist and critic, mostly in architecture and design.

== Career ==
=== Journalism and publishing ===
Long studied English literature at Cardiff University, where he earned a Bachelor of Arts degree in 1998. He began his career at Building Design, where he worked from 1998 to 2001. He then joined World Architecture Magazine (2001–2003) before serving as deputy editor of Icon Magazine (2003–2007). From 2007 to 2010, he was editor-in-chief of Architects’ Journal and The Architectural Review. From January 2010 to June 2013, he worked as an architecture critic for the London Evening Standard.

=== Television and media ===
Long has worked as a television presenter for the BBC. He presented Restoration Home, and The House That £100K Built, programmes focused on architecture, housing and renovation.

=== Museum leadership and curatorial work ===
Long has held teaching positions at several institutions. From 2011 to 2012, he was a tutor in design products at the Royal College of Art. Prior to that, he was a tutor and head of public programmes at London Metropolitan University from 2001 to 2011. He has also taught at Kingston University, the University of Greenwich, and the École Polytechnique Fédérale de Lausanne (EPFL).

In 2023, Long served as a commissioner representing Sweden in the Nordic Pavilion’s contribution to the Venice Biennale of Architecture, alongside representatives from Norway and Finland. From December 2011 to September 2012, he was assistant director of the 2012 Venice Biennale of Architecture under artistic director David Chipperfield. He led the curatorial team in delivering 73 exhibitions and installations, as well as four publications.

From September 2012 to April 2017, Long was Keeper of the Design, Architecture and Digital Department at the Victoria and Albert Museum (V&A) in London.

Long was appointed as director of the Amos Rex art museum in November 2023. The Finnish daily newspaper Helsingin Sanomat cited that Swedish media had previously reported criticism of his leadership style. In October 2025, the issue returned to public attention as Amos Rex underwent an organizational restructuring that included changes to its personnel.

Long served as Director of ArkDes, the Swedish Centre for Architecture and Design, from 2017 to 2024. Based in Stockholm, ArkDes is the national museum of architecture and design, a state authority, and a research institution focused on design, the built environment, and the role of architecture in society. Under Long's leadership at ArkDes, the institution participated in the 16th International Architecture Exhibition in 2018, presenting aspects of Sigurd Lewerentz's work.

In 2024, he was appointed director and CEO of Amos Rex in Helsinki.

=== Board memberships and advisory roles ===
Long has served as a board member and non-executive director of the V&A Dundee since 2022 and is also on the advisory board of the New Museum of Architecture and Design in Helsinki.

Previously, he was an advisory board member to the Middlesbrough Institute of Modern Art.

=== Teaching and public speaking events ===
Long has held teaching positions at the Royal College of Art in London, Kingston University, Greenwich University, London Metropolitan University, and the École Polytechnique Fédérale de Lausanne. He has also lectured widely at universities and institutions around the world, including Yale University, Columbia University, the University of California, Berkeley, Technische Universität Berlin, the Free University of Berlin, KTH Royal Institute of Technology, Chalmers University of Technology, the University of Helsinki, Aalto University, and the Canadian Centre for Architecture (CCA).

In addition, he has given public talks at major cultural events and venues such as the Chicago Architecture Biennial, Paris Photo, and M+ and the Museum Summit 2023, both in Hong Kong. Recent lectures have included presentations on the work of Sigurd Lewerentz at Yale, Columbia, and the CCA.

== Writing and publications ==
Long has written extensively about architecture and design. His book Sigurd Lewerentz, Architect of Death and Life (2021) explores the career and legacy of Swedish architect Sigurd Lewerentz. The book takes its starting point from the ArkDes collection and the results of Johan Örn and Mikael Andersson's many years of research.

=== Other publications ===
- New London Interiors (2004)
- Hatch: The New Architectural Generation (2008)
- Is This What You Mean By Localism? (2012)
- 95 Theses for Museum Curation (Dezeen, 2012)
- Common Ground: A Critical Reader (2012), co-edited with David Chipperfield and Shumi Bose
- "There is Simply Too Much To Think About: Searching for Something Like a Culture in Ryan Gander’s Fieldwork", in Fieldwork: An Incomplete Reader, Ryan Gander (2015)
- The Future Starts Here (V&A Publishing, 2018)

== Selected exhibitions curated ==
- All of This Belongs to You, Victoria and Albert Museum (2015)
- The Future Starts Here, Victoria and Albert Museum (2018)
- Public Luxury, ArkDes (2018)
- Sigurd Lewerentz, Architect of Death and Life, ArkDes (2021–22)

== Awards and recognitions ==
Long was named IBP Architecture critic of the year in 2004. In 2021, Long was named as a Bloomberg New Economy Catalyst.

== Personal life ==
Long is married to Sofia Lagerkvist, a designer and member of the Swedish design group Front. They have one son. He is a fluent Swedish speaker.
