= Skeppsholmen Church =

Former church on Skeppsholmen, Stockholm, Sweden

Coordinates: 59°19′35″N 18°04′55″E

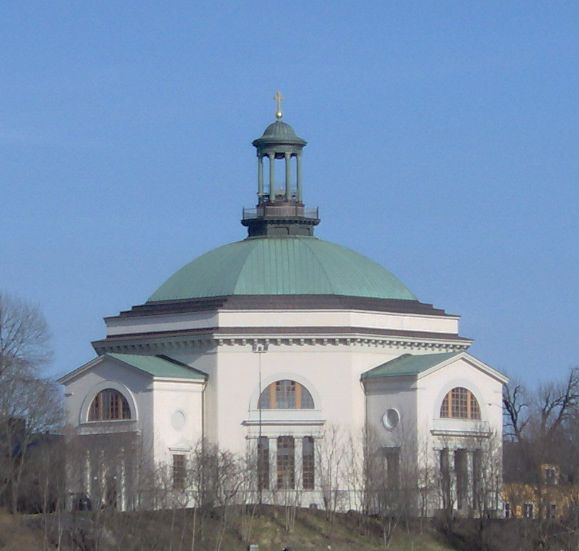
Skeppsholmen Church (now Eric Ericsonhallen) viewed from Gamla stan

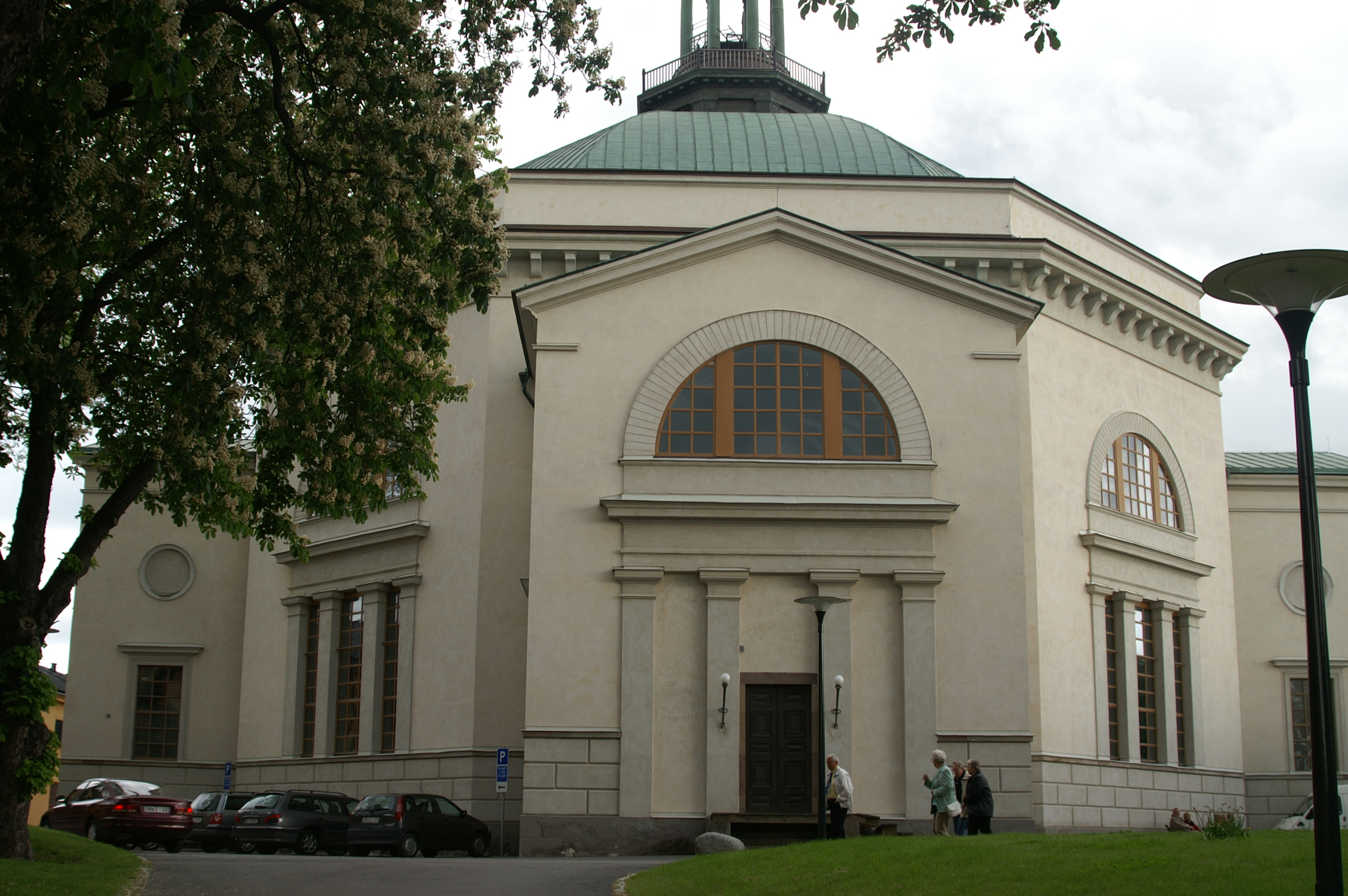
Main entrance of Eric Ericsonhallen

The Skeppsholmen Church (Swedish: Skeppsholmskyrkan) is a former church on the islet of Skeppsholmen in central Stockholm, Sweden.

== History ==
Named after its location, the church was built 1823-1849 to replace a minor wooden church on Blasieholmen destroyed in the devastating fire of 1822. Inaugurated by King Charles XIV John on 24 July 1842 and still officially carrying his name, it was designed by the architect Fredrik Blom as a neoclassical octahedral temple inspired by the Pantheon in Rome, borrowing the coffered ceiling while substituting the oculus for the temple-shaped lantern light. On all sides, the plain white walls restored in 1998 are pierced by portals whose four pillars support semi-circular lunettes. Inside the cruciform exterior, the interior sheet of the wooden double cupola is supported by paired doric columns and rounded arches. Accompanying the painted altarpiece are niches with statues of the apostles and two plaster groups.

== Eric Ericsonhallen ==
The Skeppsholmen parish was discontinued in 1969 when the Navy moved to the Muskö Naval Base, and the church was secularized in 2002. Since May 2009, the building has been a concert hall called Eric Ericsonhallen. It was named after the Swedish conductor and choral conductor Eric Ericson (1918–2013).

== See also ==
- History of Stockholm
