= Horace Gifford =

American architect

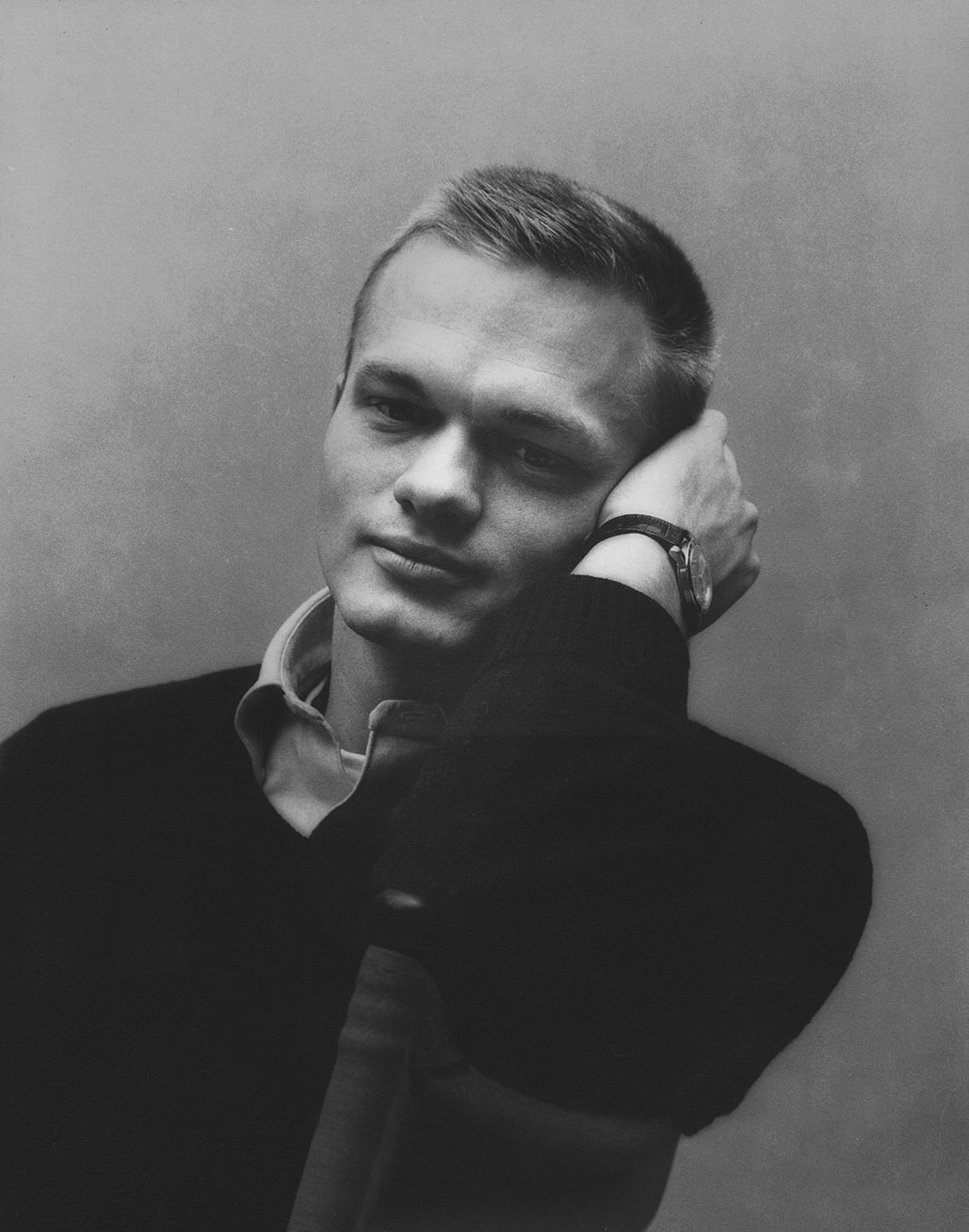
- Gifford circa 1960
- Born: August 7, 1932; Vero Beach, Florida, USA
- Died: April 6, 1992 (aged 59); Houston, Texas, USA
- Occupation: Architect
- Years active: 1960–1985

The injustice of Horace Gifford's early death was compounded by the fact that his important contribution to American domestic architecture of the 1960s and 70s has been overlooked by history.

— Paul Goldberger, Architecture critic for Vanity Fair and author of Why Architecture Matters

Horace Gifford (August 7, 1932 – April 6, 1992) was a beach house architect of the sixties, seventies, and early eighties. He grew up in Florida, where his family had developed the town of Vero Beach. Although Gifford never finished his formal architectural education—and therefore relied on licensed peers to stamp and sign off on his work—he led the Modernist transformation of New York's Fire Island, largely in its gay communities. Across this popular, car-free barrier island, off the southern coast of Long Island, he produced 63 homes, with 15 others further afield.

Long before green building came into vogue, his houses were built for sustainable design. They were designed for their sites, generally modest and using cedar wood. He rejected both the traditional New England styles of Cape Cod and Martha’s Vineyard, but also the styles of the mansions of The Hamptons. At the same time, decisively veering away from the architectural lexicon of 1950s suburbia—with its exterior paint, tidy lawns and fences—Gifford’s designs often had zigzagging entry paths, weaving amid natural beach grasses, stones, and sandy terrain. He convinced most of his clients to build houses not much bigger than 1,000 square feet, on average. Weathered over time, the cedar cladding blended with the landscape, while such features as shady overhangs and breezeways allowed for climatic comfort with natural airflow across the living spaces. Favoring open floor plans, he tended to design the living, dining, and kitchen areas as one large, continuous space. He kept closets to a minimum—and usually without doors—perhaps alluding to the closeted lives of many gay people at the time. Despite the square-footage, however, his houses—often for well-to-do figures with expansive personalities—had their own dramatic gestures, many with soaring ceilings, even in small rooms, and interiors that jutted out, over the sand dunes.

Gifford died in 1992 of complications from AIDS. Though critically praised and published during his lifetime, he was later nearly forgotten, until 2013, when architect and historian Christopher Rawlins published Fire Island Modernist: Horace Gifford and the Architecture of Seduction. The book combines the genres of monograph, biography, and social history to reveal the operatic arc of Gifford's life and times:

As the 1960s became The Sixties, architect Horace Gifford executed a remarkable series of beach houses that transformed the terrain and culture of New York's Fire Island. Growing up on the beaches of Florida, Gifford forged a deep connection with coastal landscapes. Pairing this sensitivity with jazzy improvisations on modernist themes, he perfected a sustainable modernism in cedar and glass that was as attuned to natural landscapes as to our animal natures. Gifford's serene 1960s pavilions provided refuge from a hostile world, while his exuberant post-Stonewall, pre-AIDS masterpieces orchestrated bacchanals of liberation.

— Excerpt from Fire Island Modernist: Horace Gifford and the Architecture of Seduction by Christopher Rawlins

Gifford is proof that American Modernism wasn't a single austere style after all; it gave a public voice to a surprising range of communities and ideas.

— Alan Hess, author of Julius Shulman: Palm Springs and Oscar Niemayer Houses

Although Gifford died in 1992, his most productive period ended by the early 1980's. A New York Times article incorrectly states that this is because he was outed for his sexual orientation. This is untrue. As told in Fire Island Modernist, Gifford had been out since the 1950's and many of his clients were gay or countercultural. For many years, he suffered from bipolar disorder, and then he became ill with HIV in the 1980's.
