= Fredrik Blom =

Swedish military officer and architect

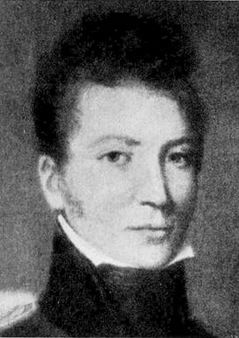
Fredrik Blom

Fredrik Blom (24 January 1781 – 25 September 1853) was a Swedish military officer, architect and professor at the Royal Swedish Academy of Arts.

== Life ==
Fredrik Blom was born in Karlskrona. His father was a compass maker journeyman. He began his career as a carpenter, working for the navy at the Karlskrona naval base. He was educated by Johan Törnström and his aesthetic talent seems to have been identified early on, probably by his superior Jonas Lidströmer. In 1798 he was relieved from his job as a carpenter and probably started studying architecture at the Royal Swedish Academy of Arts the same year.

He was taught and influenced by Louis Jean Desprez and Fredrik Magnus Piper. His first independent work was the rather unassuming (and later heavily altered) town hall of Sölvesborg, completed in 1805. Already by this time, however, he had produced proposals for purely decorative work, much in the style of Fredrik Magnus Piper. After his studies he returned to Karlskrona in 1802 and re-entered military service, as adjutant to his former benefactor Jonas Lidströmer. Lidströmer was in charge of military construction works and it was in this capacity that Fredrik Blom assisted him. In 1804, he accompanied Baltzar von Platen on an inspection tour of the Göta Canal. He also accompanied Curt von Stedingk and the Swedish delegation to Saint Petersburg charged with negotiating the Treaty of Fredrikshamn, the peace treaty ending the Finnish War. In Saint Petersburg he came in contact with the vibrant Neoclassical architectural scene there, and made several watercolours of the city.

Back in Sweden, Blom was promoted and continued doing both practical construction works for the military and other architectural commissions. He received prestigious commissions and rose quickly in rank. In 1817, he was made professor at the Royal Swedish Academy of Arts. The following years he produced his most prestigious and well-known designs, e.g. Skeppsholmskyrkan church and Rosendal Palace, both in the capital city, Stockholm.

His military career culminated with his receiving the rank of colonel in 1840.

== Selected works ==
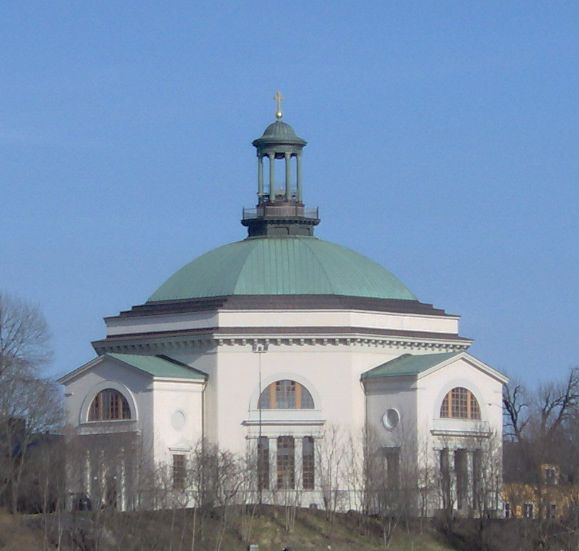
Skeppsholmskyrkan, Stockholm (1822-1833)

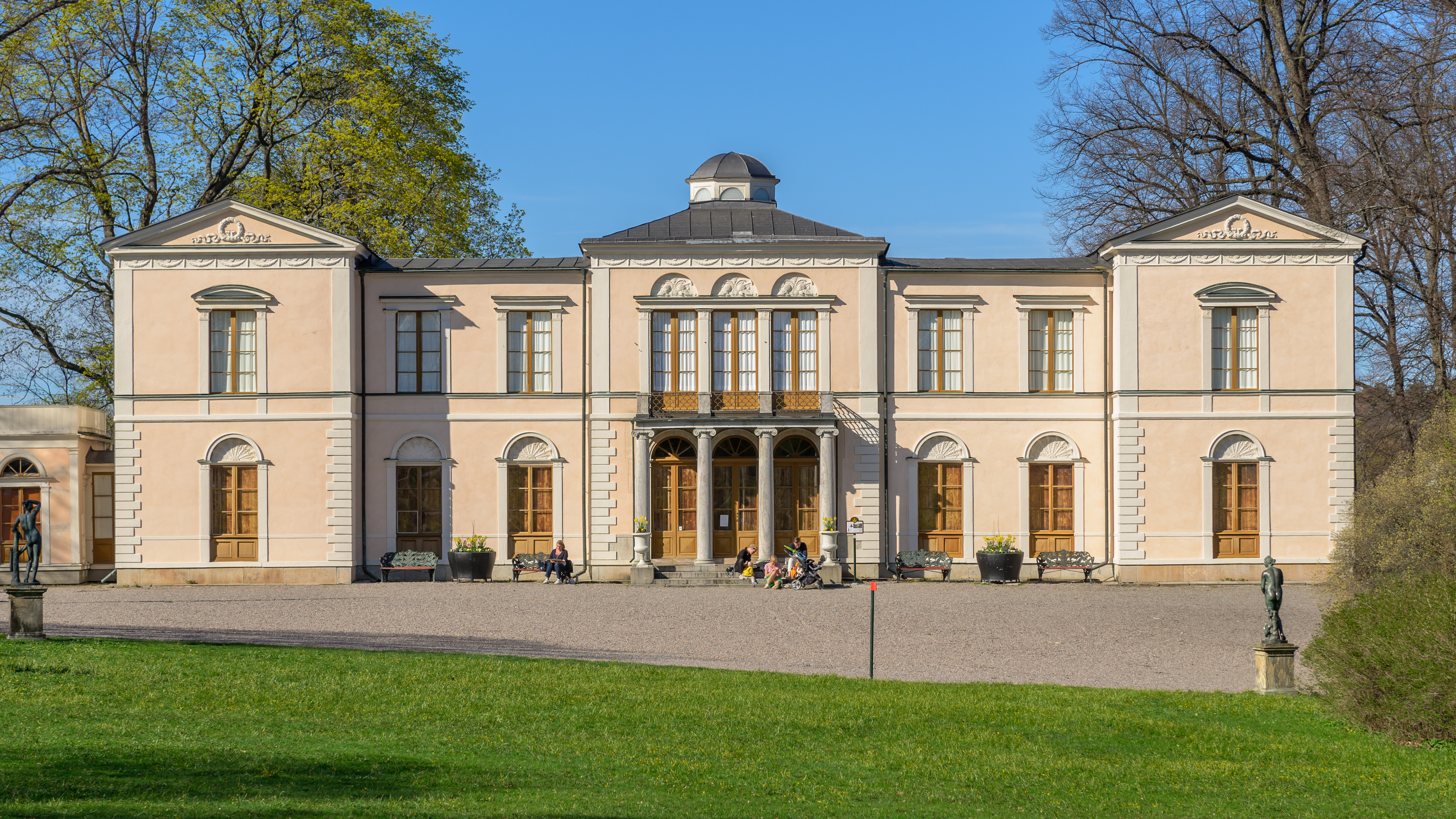
Rosendal Palace, Stockholm (1823-1827)

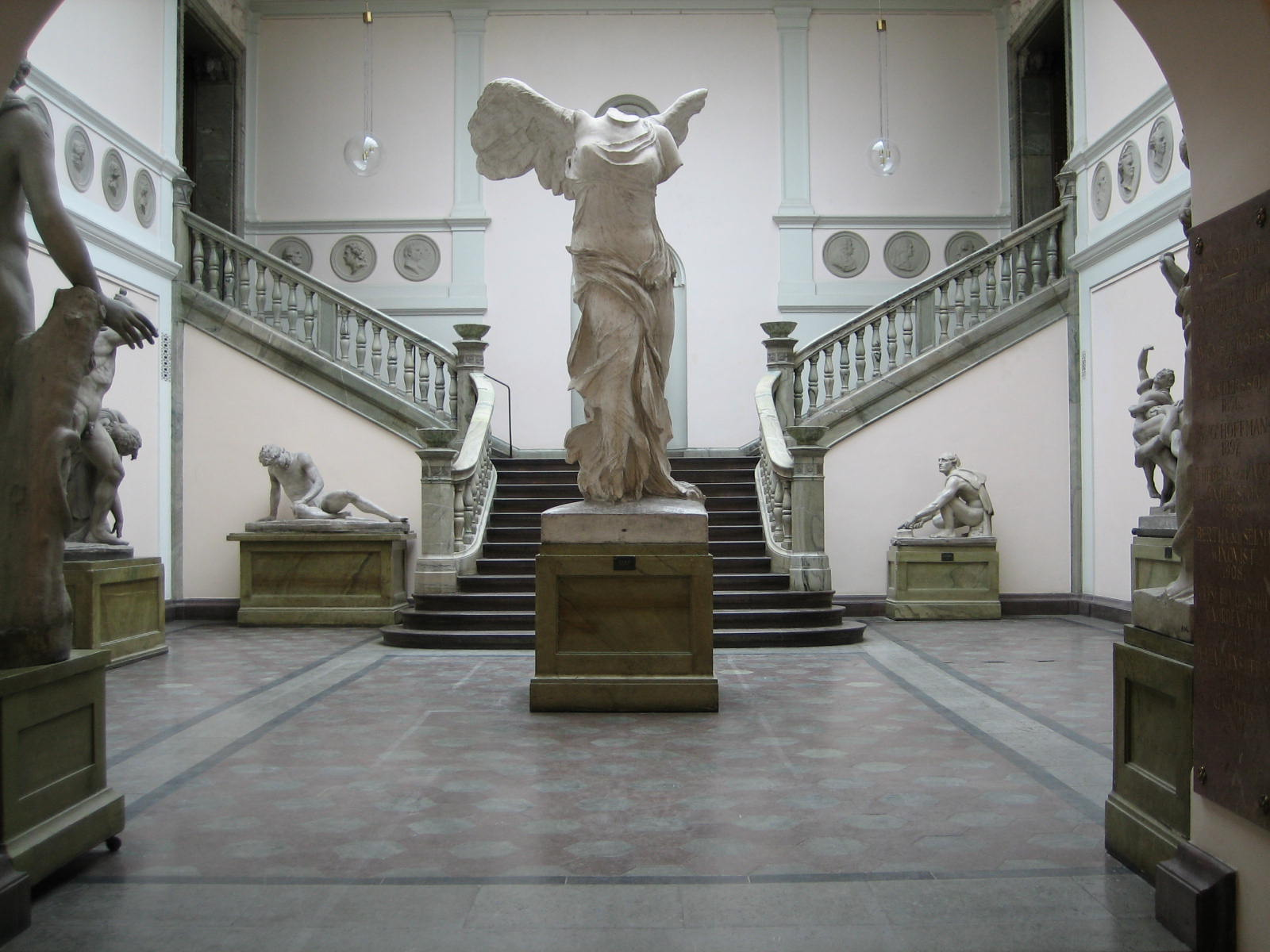
Entrance hall of the Royal Swedish Academy of Arts, Stockholm (1842-1846)

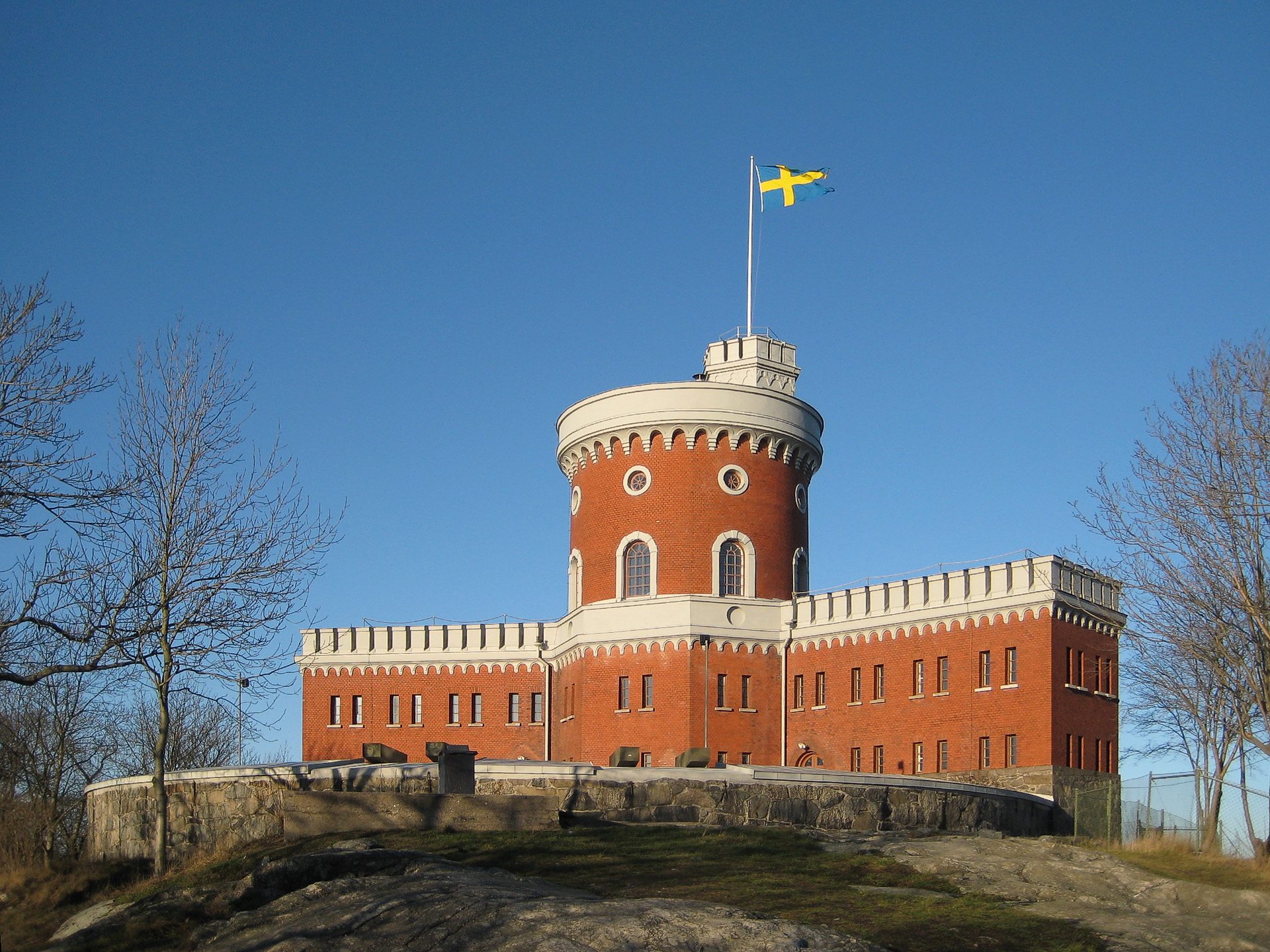
Kastellet citadel, Stockholm (1846-1848)

== Bibliography ==
- Roth, Thomas (2009). Fredrik Blom: Karl Johans arkitekt. Bokförlaget Atlantis. ISBN 978-9186221027.
