= Trädgårdstvärgränd =

Alley in Gamla stan, Stockholm, Sweden

Coordinates: 59°19′31″N 18°04′20″E

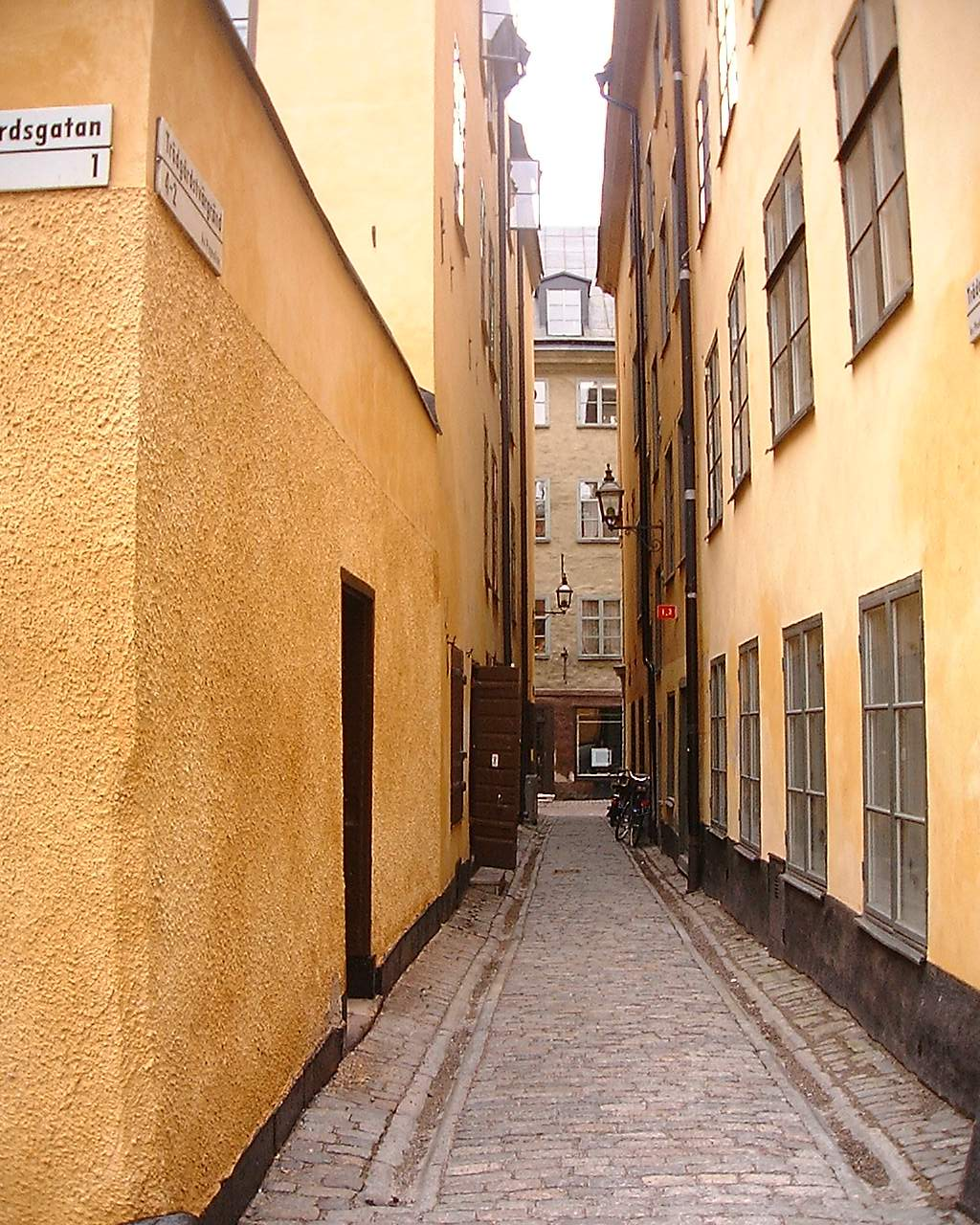
Trädgårdstvärgränd in March 2007

Trädgårdstvärgränd (Swedish for 'Garden's Cross-Alley') is a small alley in Gamla stan, the old town in central Stockholm, Sweden. Stretching north from Köpmangatan to Trädgårdsgatan, it forms a parallel street to Skeppar Olofs Gränd and Källargränd. It is located just south of Slottsbacken and Bollhustäppan, not far from Stortorget.

The alley, together with Trädgårdsgatan, is named after the vegetable gardens located here during the 16th century and belonging to the properties along the northern side of Köpmangatan and to the Royal Palace. Just like Trägårdsgatan, Trädgårdstvärgränd remained a nameless street for many years, before a man named Hans Helsing in 1456 bought a property in an alley said to be located "on the street running from Merchant's street (Köpmangatan)" (oppå the gathunne som løper fra køpmanna gatwnne). In 1488, the alley is named Swen helsingx grendh after the magistrate Sven Helsing inhabiting it, and in 1490 it is referred to as Suen helsingx bryggehus och brun mot twergrenden ("Sven helsing's brewery and well next cross-alley"). The current names of the two streets seem to have come into use during the 18th century, both appearing on maps dated 1733 and 1780.

== See also ==
- List of streets and squares in Gamla stan
