= Martinus Johannis =

Swedish clergyman

Martinus Johannis (died 15 January 1603), was a Swedish clergyman who was executed for witchcraft in Stockholm. He became infamous for debauchery, was defrocked twice and the subject of two witch trials.

== Life ==
He was from Näs parish in Uppland and born to Hans Larsson and Ingrid Gerleffdotter. Martinus Johannis was born as Mårten Hansson. As was the custom, he took a Latin name, Martinus Johannis, after having finished his studies in theology.

=== Scandals ===
Early on, he became involved in a number of scandals. In 1571 he had an illegitimate child with Anna Jönsdotter, while she was still engaged to Didrik vantmakare. He was sued for this in 1576, but refused to attend court. The court stated that: "Sir Mårten shall be taken in to custody whenever he can be found". He later married Anna Jönsdotter.

Between 1581 and 1585, he served as one of the chaplains of the cathedral Storkyrkan of Stockholm. In 1585, he lost his position because of debauchery. In 1587, he sued his wife Anna Jönsdotter for adultery. His wife demanded a divorce. The case was transferred to the Arch Bishop, who is believed to have approved of the divorce.

By the 1590s, it appears that Martinus Johannis had been defrocked and deprived of his status as a priest. Johannis eventually managed to retrieve his clerical status from the church in the late 1590s. During the 1590s, he apparently lived a life as a vagabond in the company of Margareta Nilsdotter, whom he reportedly married.

=== First witch trial ===
In March 1600, Martinus Johannis was arrested and charged in Stockholm for rape and beating of a teenage maidservant. He was also implicated for witchcraft. During the investigation: "some writings of sorcery was read, which were mighty terrifying and dangerous, not one but numerously many, which were taken from hiding places in his house". This caused sorcery to be added to the charges against him, as well as document forgery. He was ultimately sentenced to exile from the capital for life. He was also defrocked and deprived of his clerical status for the second time. In the autumn of the same year, Martinus Johannis defied the court and was back in the capital.

=== Second witch trial ===
On 1 November 1602, he was again arrested. In Vassunda in Uppland outside of Stockholm, several women had been arrested for preaching Catholic leaning religious opinions and accused of witchcraft. One of the women accused in Vassunda was a woman named Blasius Brita. She named Martinus Johannis as the leader of the group of women, and claimed that he had been their instructor. The authorities in Vassunda contacted the authorities in Stockholm, who then arrested Johannis. Due to his past as a renegade priest already previously implicated in sorcery, he was under extreme suspicion. He was interrogated and asked if he had been the wizard leader of the Vassunda witches. He was subjected to torture and confessed to his guilt.

Martinus Johannis was judged guilty of witchcraft. King Charles XI himself showed interest in the case and ordered his execution. Martinus Johannis was executed on the Stortorget in Stockholm on 15 January 1603.
