= Köpmangatan =

Street in Gamla stan, Stockholm, Sweden

Coordinates: 59°19′30.3″N 18°04′20.4″E

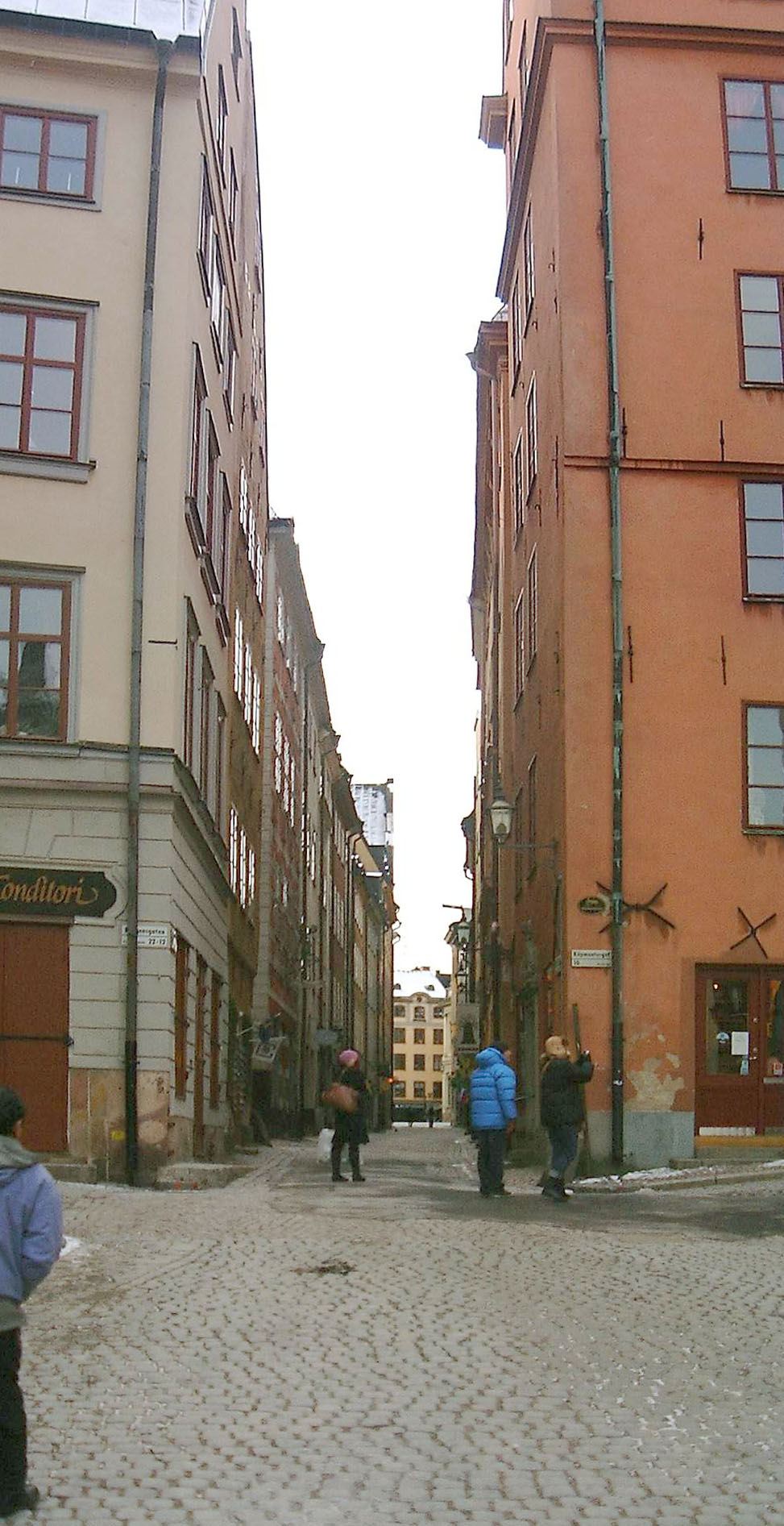
Köpmangatan in February 2007

Köpmangatan (Swedish: "The Merchant Street") is a street in Gamla stan, the old town of Stockholm, Sweden. A parallel street to Trädgårdsgatan, it stretches from the central square Stortorget to Köpmantorget, intercepted by Trädgårdstvärgränd, Skeppar Olofs Gränd, Peder Fredags Gränd, Själagårdsgatan, Staffan Sasses Gränd, Baggensgatan, and Bollhusgränd.

== History ==
First mentioned in Latin in 1323 as in medio vici dicti køpmannagatu ("on the street called køpmannagatu"), the street served the merchants of Stockholm during the Middle Ages, and was the main connection between Stortorget and the fish market outside the eastern wall. One of the city's medieval gates, Köpmanporten ("The Merchant's Gate"), was once found in the eastern end of the street, until it was demolished in 1685. Sometimes called Köpmanvalvet ("The Merchant's Vault"), the gate vault stretched across the street, thus connecting the blocks south and north of it and supported a two-story building.

== See also ==
- List of streets and squares in Gamla stan
