= Källargränd =

Alley in Stockholm, Sweden

Coordinates: 59°19′31.1″N 18°04′16.4″E

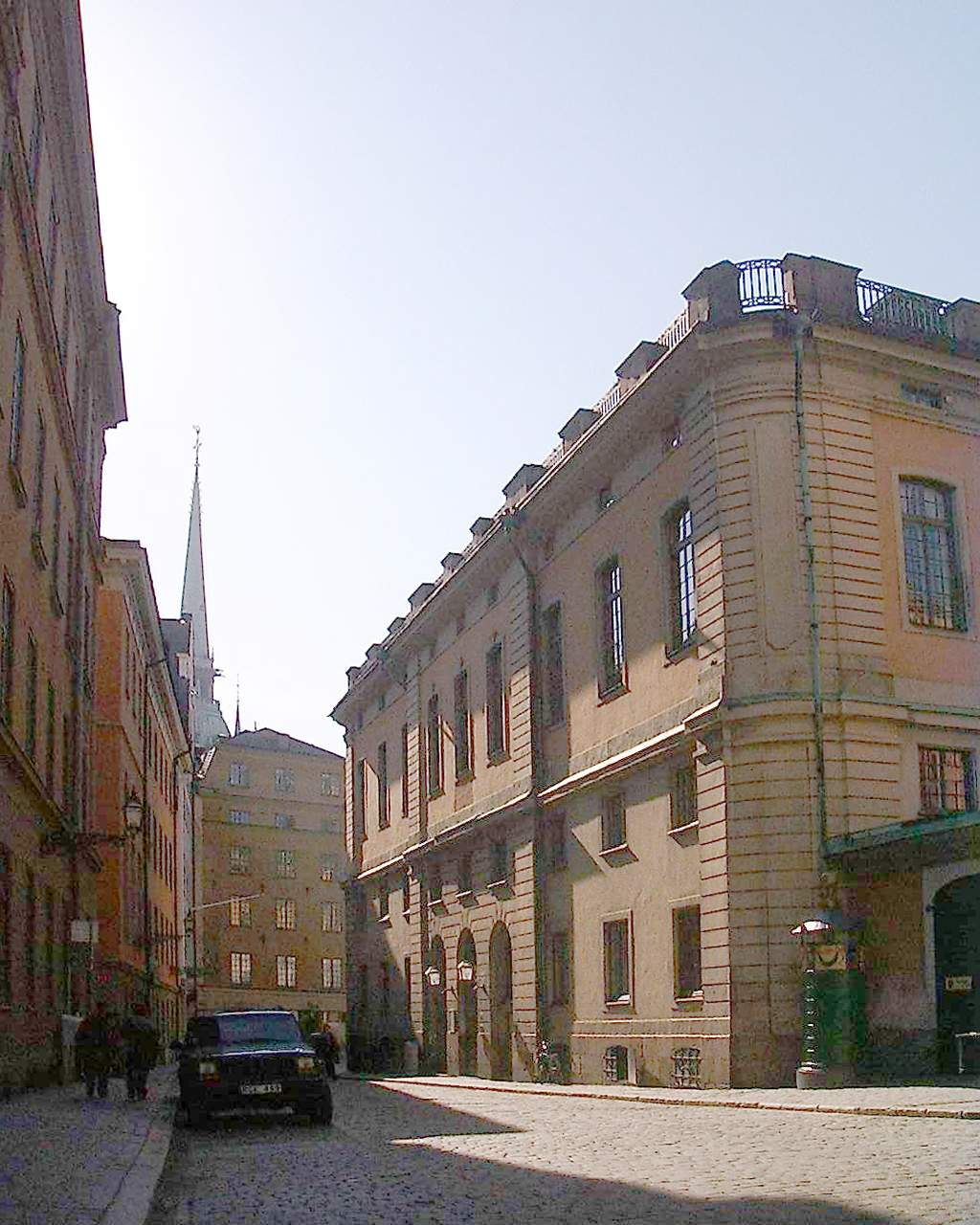
Façade of the Stock Exchange Building.

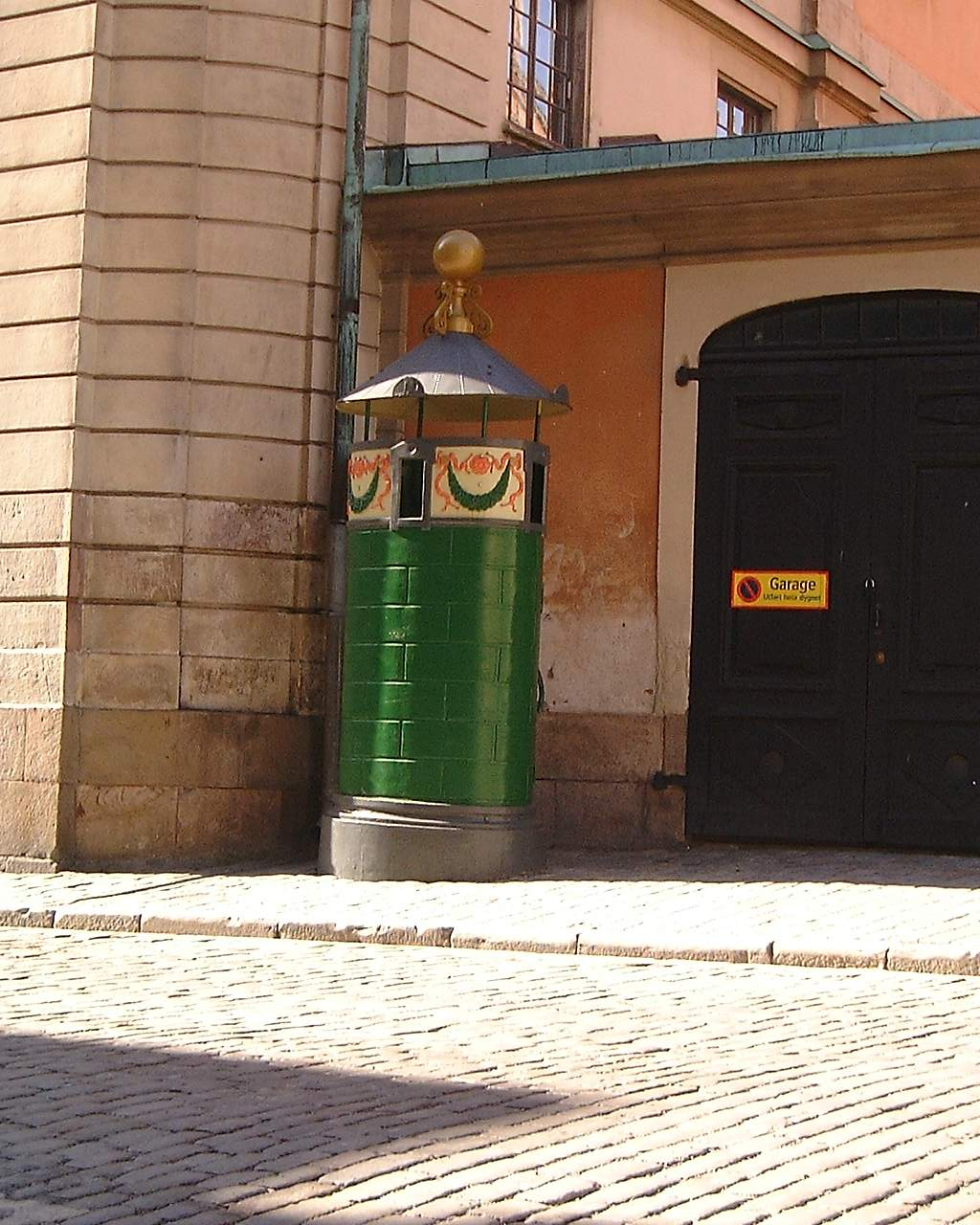
An old urinal in the alley.

Källargränd is an alley in Gamla stan, the old town in central Stockholm, Sweden, connecting Slottsbacken, the slope south of the Royal Palace, to the square Stortorget. It forms a parallel street to Trångsund and is intercepted by Trädgårdsgatan.

The alley is named after the former tavern Storkällaren ("Great basement"), which in its turn derived its name from the nearby cathedral Storkyrkan. The tavern was located under the town house, where the present Stock Exchange Building is found. The town hall was relocated to the Bonde Palace at Riddarhustorget in 1730, and when the old building was demolished in 1767, the tavern moved to Svartmangatan. The name of the alley survived in various forms: Stora Källaregränden, St. Källarbrinken (1733), Stora Kiällare-Gränden (1740) and Källar-Gränd (1855). A new tavern was opened when the stock exchange was inaugurated, and this remained in business until 1906.

The Swedish Academy and the Nobel Library are on number 4.

Two sandstone sculptures, Hoppet ("Hope") and Försiktighet ("Guardedness") by Kortz Daniel from 1702 are located in the alley.

== See also ==
- List of streets and squares in Gamla stan
