= Skeppar Olofs gränd =

Alley in Gamla stan, Stockholm, Sweden

Coordinates: 59°19′31.00″N 18°04′21.50″E

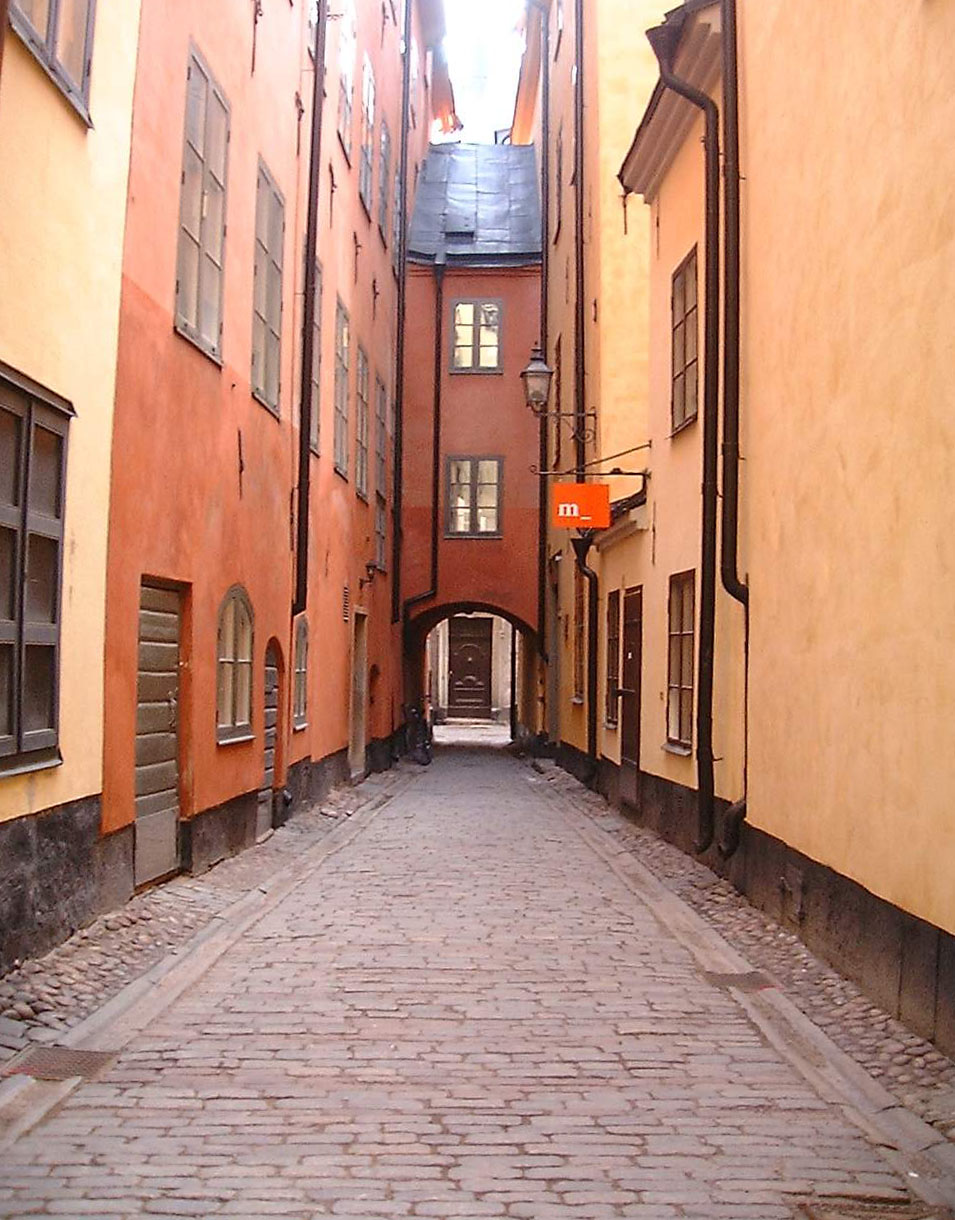
Skeppar Olofs gränd in March 2007.

Skeppar Olofs gränd (Swedish: "Alley of Skipper Olof") is an alley in Gamla stan, the old town in central Stockholm, Sweden. Stretching from Köpmangatan to Trädgårdsgatan, it forms a parallel street to Peder Fredags gränd and Trädgårdstvärgränd.

== History ==
Appearing in historical records as skepper Olaffz grändh in 1587, the alley is named after the skipper Olof Eriksson. Commonly known as Skeppar Olof, he served under King Gustav Vasa from 1525 and was skipper on board the ship Ugglan ("The Owl") in 1526. He was one of the leading figures in the organisation of the first fleet of the Swedish Navy, both as a master shipbuilder and as a naval commander. As one of the most trusted merchants of the king, Olof made a fortune, and as one of the most prominent burghers in the city, he was appointed magistrate, member of a court of first instance, head of the goldsmith guild, and churchwarden at the Cathedral. Skeppar Olof died in 1555 and is buried in the cathedral (which he saved from the king's plans to demolish it). One of the many buildings he owned was located between the alley and Österlånggatan, in 1528 it was referred to as Schepar Olofz huus i Olof Grelsons g[ränd] ("House of Skipper Olof in the alley of Olof Grelson"), and in 1597 it was subject to his widow's distribution of the estate. The skipper in question might have lived in the medieval building on the right side directly after the vault.

In the alley is a memorial tile dedicated to Sara Wacklin (1790–1846), a teacher and writer who was born in Uleåborg (Oulu), moved to Stockholm in 1843, and lived and eventually died in the alley. She is mostly remembered for her book Hundrade minnen från Österbotten ("A Hundred memories from Ostrobothnia", 1844–45) which deals with the fate of Finland following the Swedish defeat in the Finnish War of 1807–1809, and condemns those who "longed for war without having seen its atrocities".

== See also ==
- List of streets and squares in Gamla stan
