= Stortorget =

Square in Gamla Stan, Stockholm, Sweden

Coordinates: 59°19′30″N 18°04′15″E

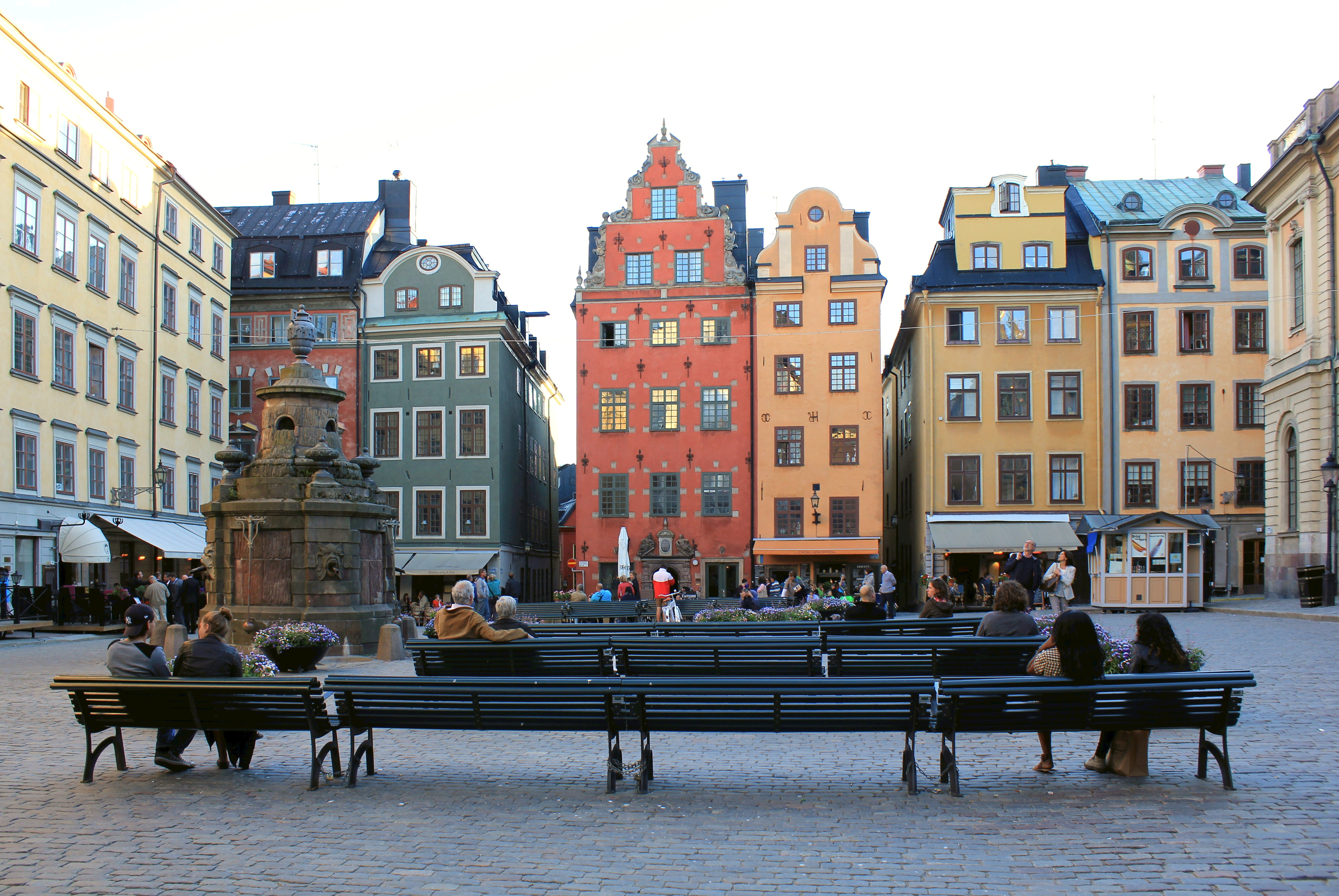
Stortorget June 2013

Stortorget (Swedish: [ˈstûːˌʈɔrjɛt], "the Grand Square") is a public square in Gamla Stan, the old town in central Stockholm, Sweden. It is the oldest square in Stockholm, the historical centre on which the medieval urban conglomeration gradually came into being. Today, the square is frequented by tens of thousands of tourists annually, and is occasionally the scene for demonstrations and performances. It is traditionally renowned for its annual Christmas market offering traditional handicrafts and food.

== Notable buildings and structures ==
Located in the centre of the plateau of Stadsholmen, the square never was the stylish show-piece occupying the centre of many other European cities during the Middle Ages; it was created gradually, buildings and blocks around the square, still sloping west, occasionally added haphazardly. The exception being the Stock Exchange Building taking up the northern side of the square and concealing the Cathedral and the Royal Palace.

=== The Stock Exchange Building and the well ===
Today, Stortorget is the location of the Stock Exchange Building (Börshuset), which houses the Swedish Academy, the Nobel Museum, and the Nobel Library. Designed by Erik Palmstedt and built 1773–1776, it replaced the town hall that had occupied the lot for several hundreds years before and subsequently been relocated first to the Bonde Palace and then to the present Court House in 1915. The plan of the building, French Rococo in style, is a trapezium, the rounded corner of which greatly widened the flanking alleys. While the building is generally designed much like a private palace, the central pediment and the lantern-style cupola crowning the building underline its public status. The closed first floor, accommodating the Swedish Academy, contrasts the openness of the ground floor—a contrast enhanced during the restoration in the 1980s.

The present well on the square was also designed by Palmstedt and built in connection to the new Stock Exchange Building. It dried up in 1856 due to land elevation, however. It was relocated to Brunkebergstorg but moved back to its original location in the 1950s and is today connected to the city water conduit.

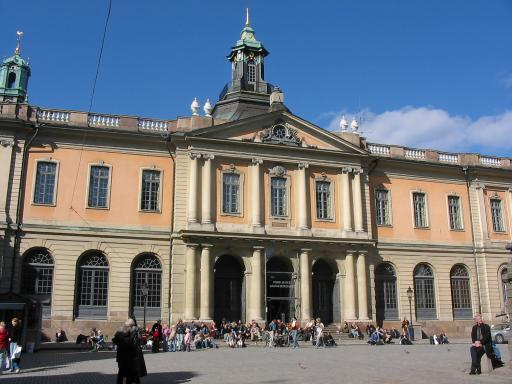
Façade of the Stock Exchange Building.

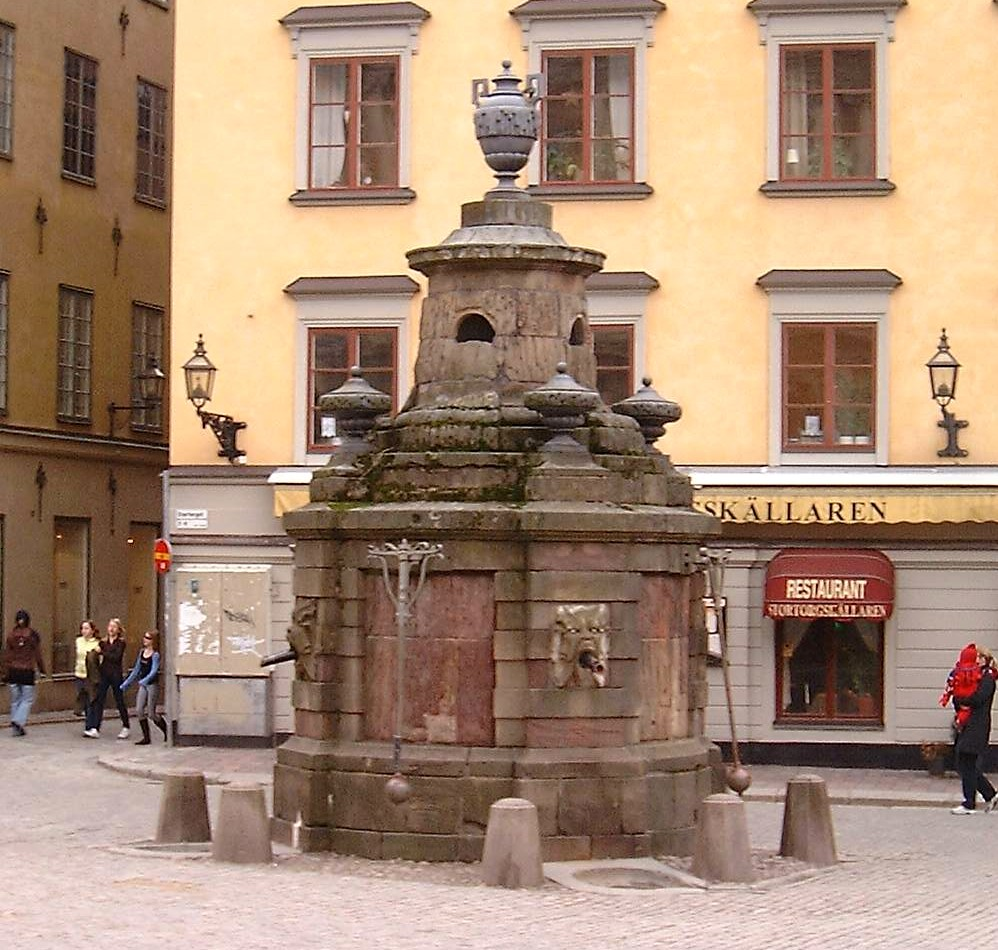
The well

=== Number 3–5 ===
Built by the merchant Hans Bremer in the 1640s and originally featuring pointed cairns, Number 3, on the right side of Köpmangatan still features the original cross vaults and a German inscription in the entrance hall. However, the building is today called Grillska huset ("The Grill House") after the goldsmith Antoni Grill, who immigrated from Amsterdam to Sweden in 1659 during the era of Carl Gustav to found the Grill Dynasty. He bought the building in 1681 which came to remain in the family's possession for more than a century. The cloverleaf-shaped gables were added in 1718 together with the blue livid colour and the Rococo portal. The Dynasty's most prominent member was the merchant Claes Grill (1705–1767), leader of the East India Company, owner of several banks and many mining industries and shipping companies, and a great art collector. The building is today the headquarters of the Stockholm´s City Mission, an independent Christian charity devoted to support homeless and exposed citizens with food, accommodation, and education, also running advisory bureaus and others elsewhere in the old town.

In the second hand shop on Number 5 are painted joists from the 1640s displaying animals, flowers, and fruits. There are many such restored ceilings in Gamla stan, but this one is one of the few accessible to the general public. On the first floor is the so-called Bullkyrkan ("Bun Church") where the City Mission offers services every Sunday together with buns, sandwiches, and coffee. Rev. Karl-Erik Kejne, who served in the church in the 1950s, was quoted by public service radio saying working there was a grateful commission as the penniless and homeless crowded the church where other congregations were considerably more conspicuous by their absence.

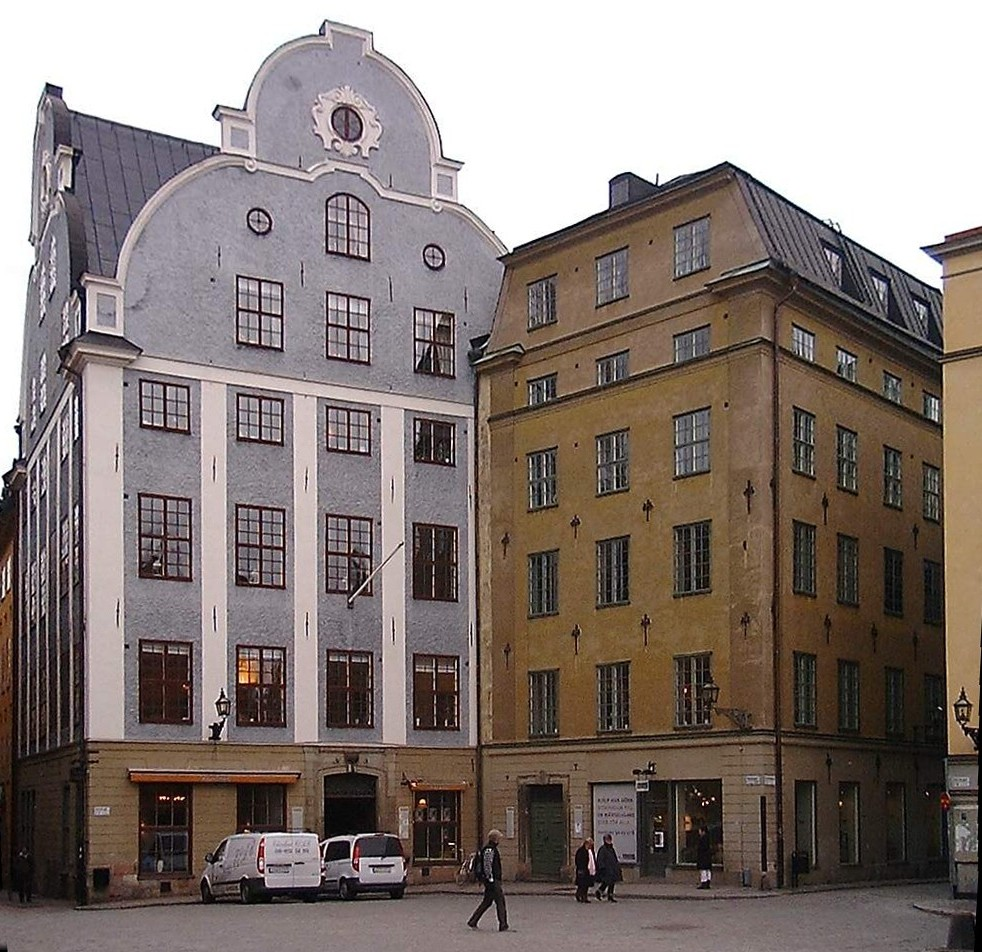
Number 3–5.

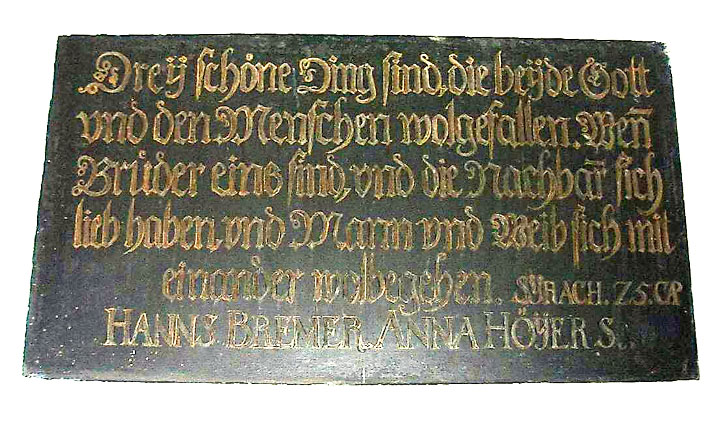
German inscription at Number 3.

=== Number 7 ===
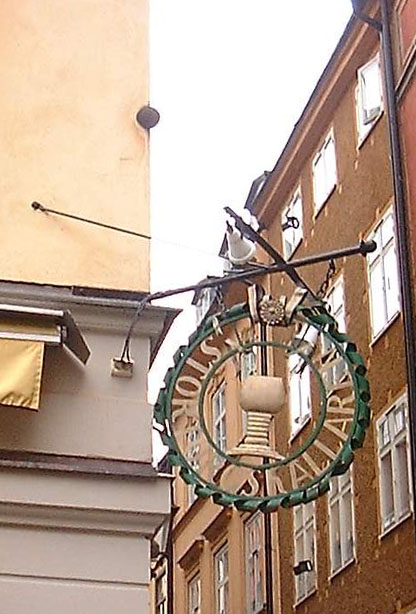
Cannonball and sign at Number 7.

Until the mid-15th century, the south side of the square was lined with wooden shops, in the spacious basements of which peasants kept their provisions and prepared meals. Among the numerous historical tenants in the building was adventurer Filip Kern from Meissen, Saxony. He served as a barber and a master builder for King John III and is suspected to have poisoned King Eric XIV. During the reign of Gustavus Adolphus, the Dutch merchant Abraham Cabiljau, one of the founders and first mayors of Gothenburg, lived in the building. The French wig maker Jean Bedoire bought the building in 1682 and, just like his son and namesake who gave his name to the alley Bedoirsgränd, made a fortune in trading wine, salt, and iron. The building was completely rebuilt in 1937 when the façades of the three buildings located south of the square were united to form the present façade. Occupying the three buildings in the block since 1944 is the Mäster Olofsgården ("Homestead of Master Olof"). It was founded as a youth centre by the priest Gabriel Grefberg in 1931 when Gamla stan was mostly a slum, and the number of activities quickly grew to include elderly, mothers, scouts, workers, and many other groups. Following a generous donation, the organisation was able to gather its activities to the present location in 1944. Today its services include studies in the history of the old town and the "Gamla stan Society" (Gamla stan sällskapet). The cannonball in the corner of Skomakargatan, according to popular legend, dates back to the Stockholm Bloodbath in 1520, when it was fired at the Danish king of the Kalmar Union, Christian II. Undoubtedly, it was more likely built into the wall by an early proprietor and subsequently put back into place after each restoration. The restaurant on the ground floor, Stortorgskällaren, is built over a medieval basement, part of which dates back to the 15th century. According to some sources, this was the location for the tavern Spanska druvan ("The Spanish Grape"), the oldest known tavern in Stockholm, which was (according to tradition) frequented by King John III when he wanted to mingle with commoners.

=== Number 14–22 ===
The buildings on the west side are the only ones occupied by private persons.

Number 22, the green building on the left side of Kåkbrinken, is from 1758 but is standing on medieval walls. It was occupied by the councillor Johan Berndes who developed the Swedish copper production in the 17th century, then by the Saxon Polycarpus Crumbügel, close friend to King Charles XI who caused the so-called Reduction when an important part of the Swedish nobility lost its estates (for which he was raised to peerage as Cronhielm). During an archaeological excavation in 1998, a vaulted chamber measuring 1.8×1.6 metres (approx. 5'11"×5'3") was discovered in the basement. It was supplied with a channel which is believed to have connected it to privies and kitchen sinks in the building. Along with some wooden tubes found near Kornhamnstorg, it is one of the few indications contradicting the traditional view of medieval Stockholm as a repulsive place where filth and refuse filled the streets.

The buildings on Number 18-20 were merged in the 17th century and subsequently named after Johan Eberhard Schantz, the secretary of Charles X Gustavus who also added the stepped gable and the grand portal on the left building. Parts of the interior still reflect the luxury which surrounded the royal secretary. The 82 white stones on Number 20, Ribbinska huset ("House of Ribbing") or Schantzka huset ("House of Schantz"), are occasionally said to symbolize the heads decapitated by the king in 1520. The house was, however, built no later than 1479, when it appears in historical records. The former of the names refers to the councillor Bo Ribbing who gave the property to Schantz in 1627, who added the stones the following year.

The block on Number 14–16 is named after Æsculapius, the son of Apollo and the demigod of medicine, which reflects the presence of the "Raven Pharmacy" (Apoteket Korpen) at this address for more than 300 years. While still present on Västerlånggatan just a few blocks away, the pharmacy was originally settled on Stortorget in 1638 when the court pharmacist Philip Schmidt offered not only medicine at this address, but also assorted sweets and mulled wine. In the alley Solgränd, the initials of the pharmacist in 1764 and his wife are still found on the wall. The pharmacy was relocated to its present address in 1924.

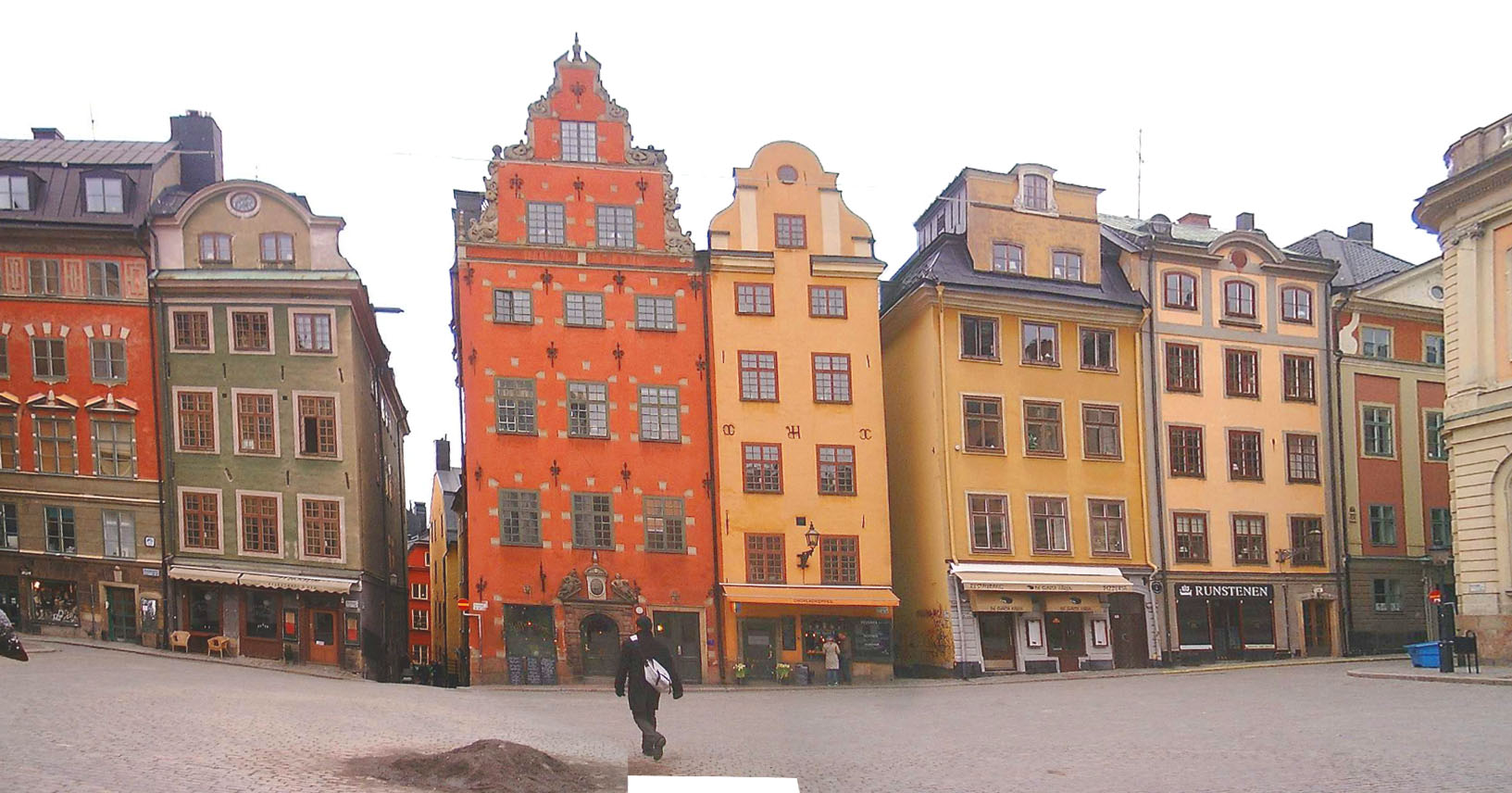
Panoramic view of Stortorget 22–14. Composite of three photos.

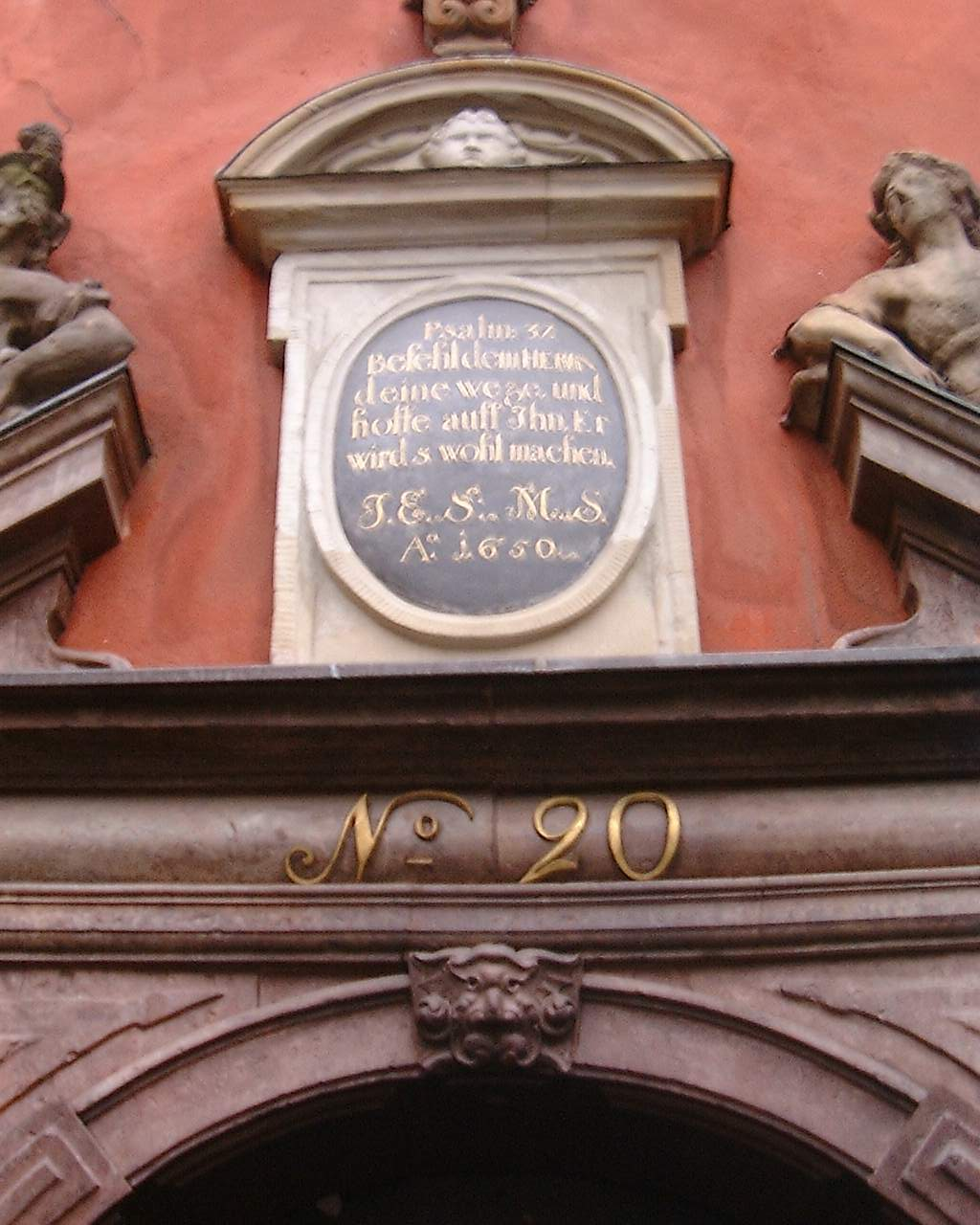
Inscription over the front door of 20 quoting Psalm 37:5 in German: "Befiehl dem Herrn deine Wege und hoffe auf ihn, er wirds wohl machen". English translation: "Commit thy way unto the Lord; trust also in Him, and He will bring it to pass."

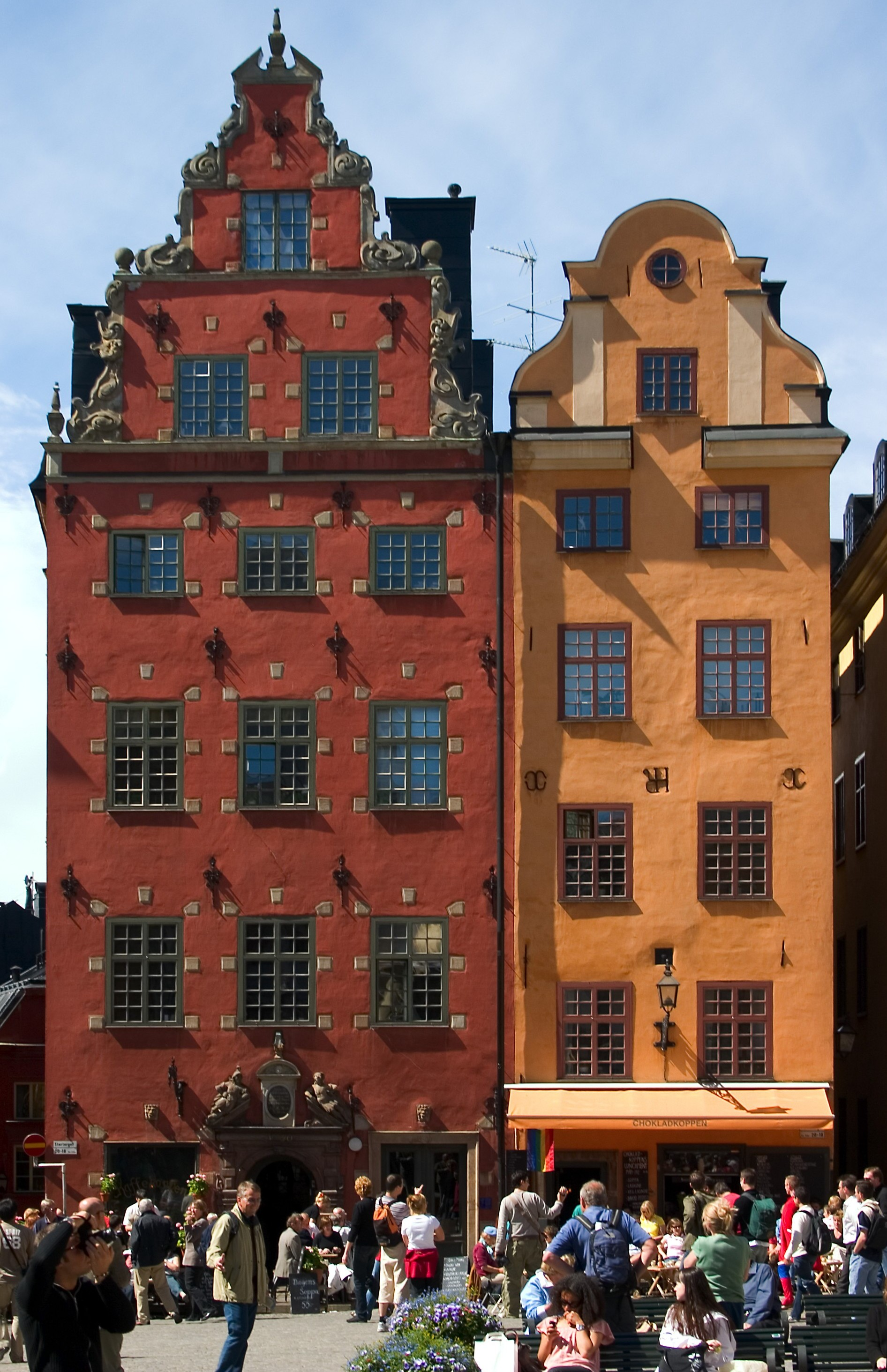
Numbers 20 and 18.

=== Streets and alleys ===
Historical thoroughfares stretch from Stortorget in all cardinal directions: Kåkbrinken ("Slope of the [Ramshackle] House") stretches west down to Västerlånggatan. Skomakargatan ("Shoemaker's Street") and Svartmangatan ("Black Man's Street") stretch south to Tyska Brinken ("German Slope") and Kindstugatan ("Box on the ear Street"), both of which used to lead past the Blackfriars monastery to the southern gate. Köpmangatan ("Merchant's Street"), paralleled by Trädgårdsgatan ("Garden Street") north of it, leads east to Köpmantorget ("Merchant's Square"), Köpmanbrinken ("Merchant's Slope") and Österlånggatan ("Eastern Long Street"), and used to be the only street leading through the eastern city wall down to Fisketorget, a former square and for hundreds of years the largest in Stockholm. Furthermore, a number of alleys connect to the immediate surrounding blocks: On the northern side, Trångsund and Källargränd stretch to Storkyrkobrinken and Slottsbacken on either side of the Stock Exchange Building. On the west side, three alleys — Solgränd, Ankargränd, and Spektens gränd — stretch down to Prästgatan.

== History ==
=== Prehistory ===
Archaeological excavations along Kåkbrinken have shown the original boulder ridge is found directly under the pavement near Stortorget and gradually located deeper and deeper westward to reach some 12–15 m along the western shoreline. Therefore, it is rather reasonable to assume that the gently-sloping square continues still reflects the shape of the original unsettled island.

=== Middle Ages ===
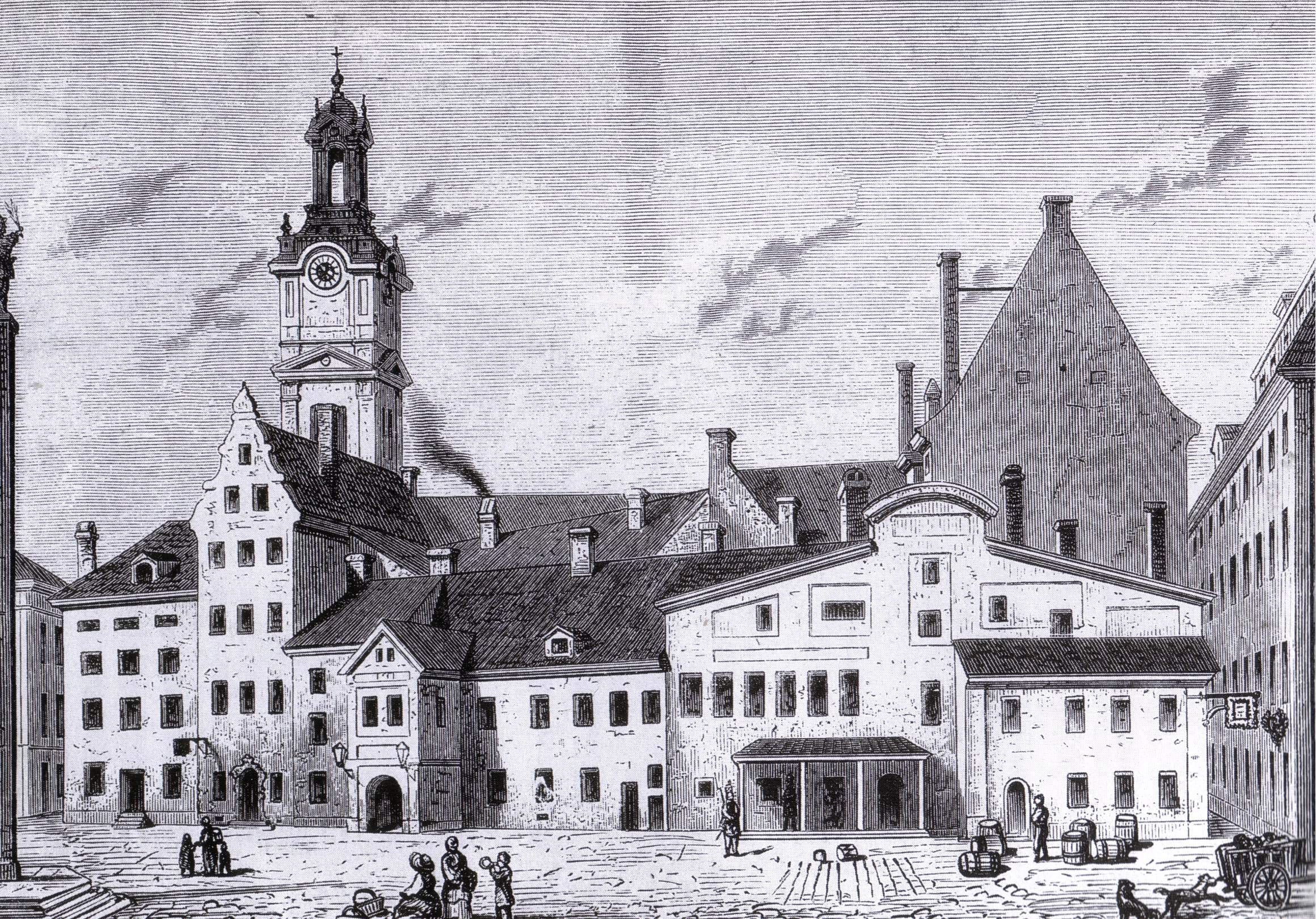
Rådstugan as drawn by Erik Palmstedt in 1768. The pillory Kåken is discernible on the extreme left and the then-extremely narrow alleys Trångsund and Källargränd flank the town hall.

Excavations on the square in 1995 and 1997 showed that the mediaeval square is only 0.5 m below the present cobbles. Just above the deepest layer, coins from the reigns of Magnus Ladulås and Birger Magnusson were found, together with ceramic sherds from the same eras. Three additional layers of cobbles from the Middle Ages as well as a coal mixed layer, just below the lower cobble level, have been radiocarbon dated to 1066-1320. More superficial traces of poles indicate that simple sheds occupied the area in the late 13th century until they were destroyed by fire in the early 15th century, and traces of an older building are believed to date to 1024–1291.

The square started as a junction in which the tracks that criss-crossed the island converged. The dawning street system gradually developed into the current narrow streets Köpmangatan, Svartmangatan, Skomakargatan, Kåkbrinken, Trångsund and Källargränd. By 1400, the city had some 6,000 inhabitants, and stone buildings started to be built around the square. Its merchants and the well on the square made it a natural meeting place. The present name first appears in historical records as stora torghit in 1420 and as stoor tårgeett in 1646.

The decrees proclaimed twice per year from the town hall, called Rådstugan ("Council Homestead"), once north of the square, together with recurrent manifestations, such as that of Engelbrekt Engelbrektsson leader of the Engelbrekt Rebellion (1434–1436), made the square a politically-vital location. As the Germans long had a very important presence in Stockholm, the city council was composed by an equal number of Swedish citizens and German immigrants. Merchants, all burghers, dominated the assembly; craftsmen were occasionally entrusted minor commissions. The remaining citizens were entirely excluded from any influence. Stockholm was a one-horse town, compared to splendid Continental European cities. The city hall was rebuilt following a fire in 1419 and gradually expanded over 500 years until it was relocated to the Bonde Palace in 1732. It was thus a four-storey coherent complex. On the third floor were custodies known as Siskeburen ("The Siskin Cage"), Loppan ("The Flea"), and Vita märren ("The Mare"), Vita hästen ("The White Horse"), Gamla Rådstugan ("Old Council Homestead"), Skottkammaren ("Scottish Chamber"), and Nya kölden ("The New Cold"). In the basement was the city wine store, next to the memorable tavern Storkällaren (named because of it proximity to Storkyrkan).

=== Modern times ===
In the middle of the square was the pillory called Kåken ("The [Ramshackle] House", see Kåkbrinken), first mentioned in connection to the so-called "Käpplinge murders" (Käpplingemorden) in the first half of the 15th century. The story is that a group German burghers who trapped a large number of prominent citizens in a hovel on Blasieholmen (then called Käpplinge) and burned them in. The Germans are said to have been led from the Royal Palace to the pillory. Originally, the pillory was placed atop a bricked prison, where the despised executioner kept those sentenced before shackling and whipping them, or even cutting their ears off, depending on the nature of the crimes. The pillory was relocated to the present Norrmalmstorg in 1771, when the Stock Exchange Building and the present well were completed.

Stortorget was the scene of the Stockholm Bloodbath in November 1520. For three days, the Danish-Swedish union king Christian II beheaded and hanged 90 people. That deed was accomplished despite the reprieve proclaimed by Queen Christina Gyllenstierna after four months of Danish siege. Still, the king was not directly responsible for the deed. Archbishop Gustav Trolle, dethroned and imprisoned by the regent Sten Sture the Elder, who died during the siege, wanted to obtain a redress. Therefore, during the coronation of the new king, the prominent guests were confronted with the bill of indictment of the archbishop and subsequently condemned for blasphemy. The death sentences were to be accomplished at once and so the square was cleared while a curfew forced all citizens to stay indoors. The executioners beheaded archbishops, councillors, noblemen and city magistrates indiscriminately, including Erik Johansson Vasa, the father of the succeeding King Gustav Vasa, who escaped the fate of his father by hiding. All the bodies were burned on Södermalm, together with the body of the dead regent, Sten Sture. The king, satisfied with having pacified Sweden, returned to Denmark in December, drowning a few monks during the trip and ignoring the dawning insurrection in Dalarna.

By the end of the 19th century, the Swedish working class still lacked representation in the Parliament and the City Council. A committee, formed in 1892, in vain urged the council to counteract unemployment and alleviate distress by initiating roadworks and taking other measures. The labour demonstration of 1892 were subsequently fixed for February 1, when the council had a meeting in the Stock Exchange Building. To avoid the demonstration prohibition from 1848, people gathered on various locations to unite on the square. As they ran across deputies and other notables on Slottsbacken, they were stopped by the police from reaching the square. Surrounding alleys quickly got clogged by demonstrators, however, and the cordon had to give way to the crowd, whose cries and protest songs quickly filled the square. Future Prime Minister Hjalmar Branting got involved in a dispute before the crowd threatened to intrude the Stock Exchange Build from Trångsund. The police then got assistance from the Royal Body Guard, which made demonstrators flee into the alleys to escape the horses and the sabres. Dozens got arrested, but a growing awareness among politicians occurred on the situation of the working force.

== See also ==
- History of Stockholm
- List of streets and squares in Gamla stan
