= Ankargränd =

Alley in Gamla stan, Stockholm, Sweden

Coordinates: 59°19′31″N 18°04′11″E

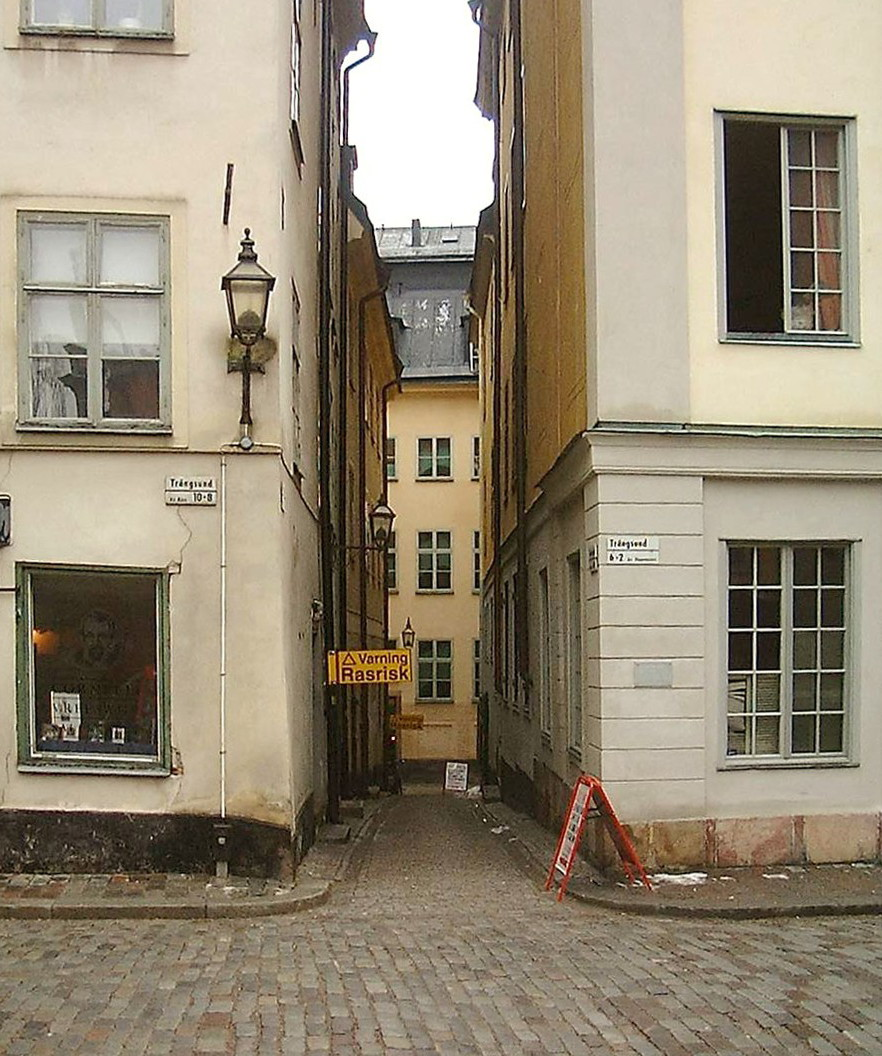
Ankargränd in March 2007.

Ankargränd (Swedish: "Anchor Alley") is an alley in Gamla stan, the old town of Stockholm, Sweden, connecting the streets Trångsund and Prästgatan, just west of church Storkyrkan. Ankargränd is a parallel street to Storkyrkobrinken, Spektens gränd, Solgränd, and Kåkbrinken.

Derived from a Marcus Andersson Ankar (-1704) and his simple eating house (or fast food restaurant as it is called today) Ankaret ("The Anchor") on Number 5 in front of the church. While the restaurant was in operation in the late 17th century, the present name of the alley is first mentioned in 1731, before which it seems to have been a nameless backstreet. The present building on Number 5 was built to the plans of Erik Palmstedt in 1772 and retains its original appearance with its rounded Rococo corner facing Prästgatan and small barred windows.

The Cornelis Vreeswijk Museum is located on Ankargränd.

== See also ==
- List of streets and squares in Gamla stan
