= Spektens Gränd =

Alley in Gamla stan, Stockholm, Sweden

Coordinates: 59°19′30.70″N 18°04′11.70″E

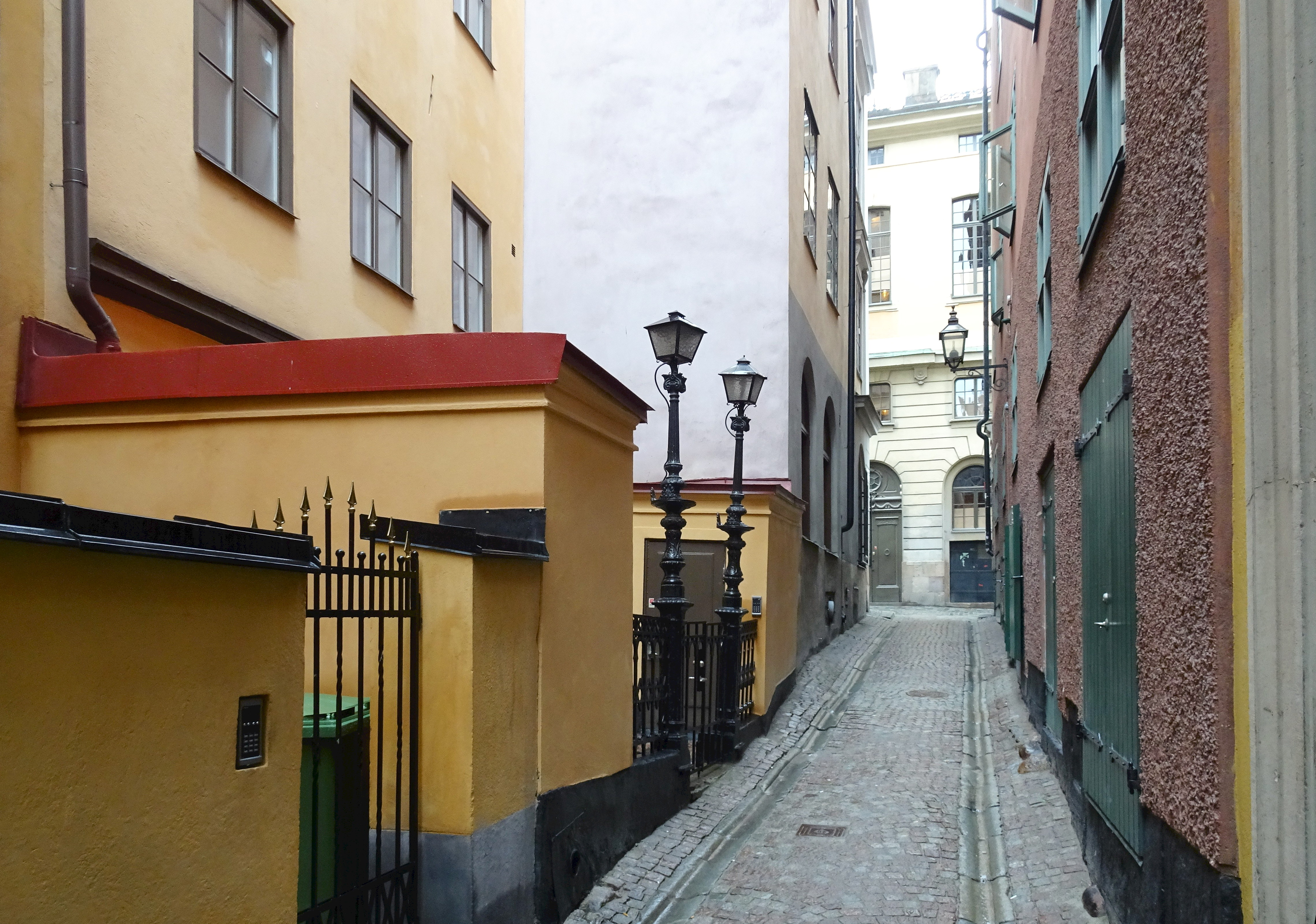
Spektens gränd 2016. View facing east with the Stockholm Stock Exchange Building in the background.

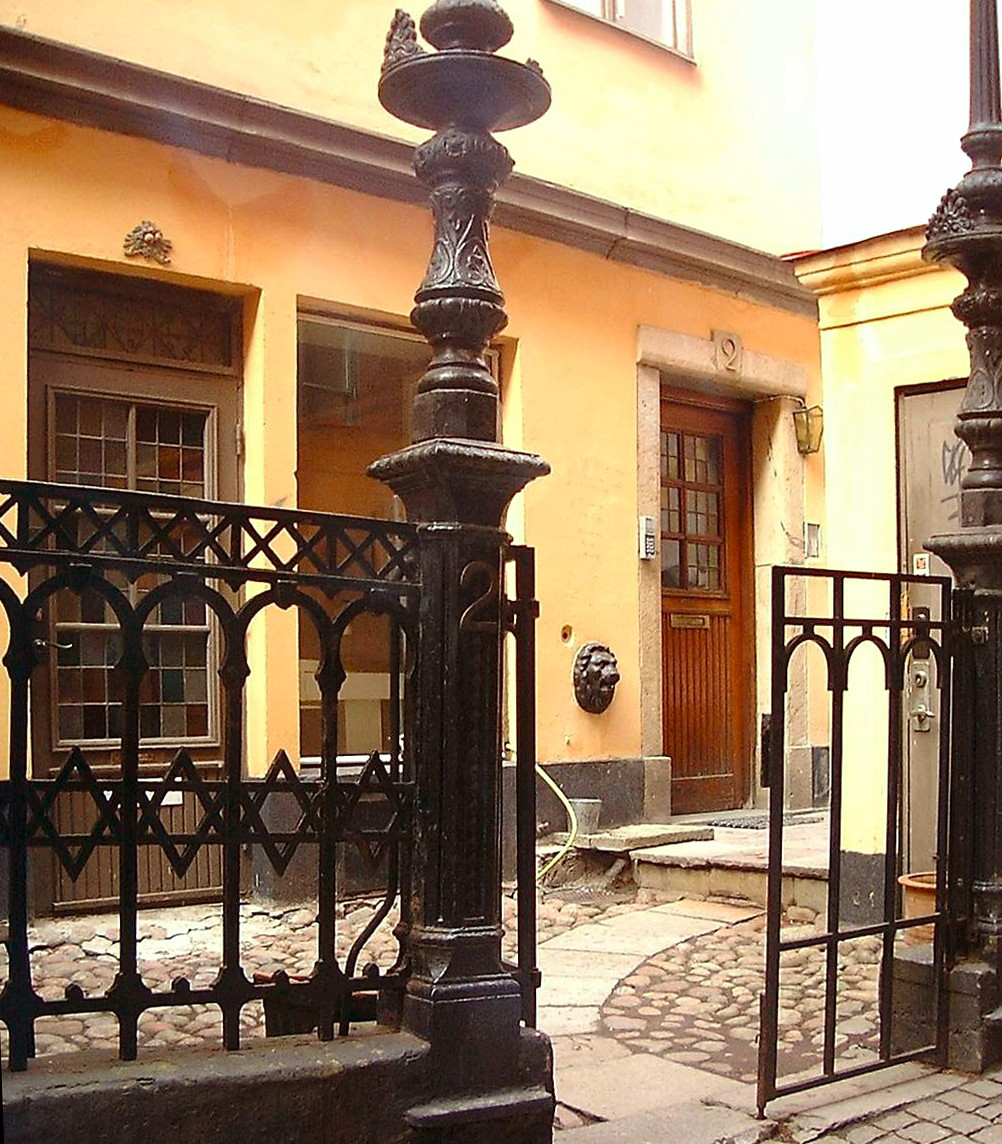
Cast iron decorations in the easternmost of the two courtyards in the alley.

Spektens gränd (Swedish: Alley of Spekten) is an alley in Gamla stan, the old town of Stockholm, Sweden. Located just west of Storkyrkan church, it connects the streets Trångsund and Prästgatan. It runs parallel to Storkyrkobrinken, Ankargränd, Solgränd and Kåkbrinken streets.

The alley was created when the block between Ankargränd and Kåkbrinken was split in two in 1675. One of the houses built at the time was sold to the merchant Gert Specht in 1685, from whom the alley got its unintelligible name. A Gert Specht is mentioned in the records as being a resident of Norrmalm in 1594. He was probably the father or grandfather of the former.

In the alley are two small courtyards. One featuring cast iron decorations, including a lion head, a fence decorated with the star of David, and a small gate flanked by two lampposts. The other has a portal with the inscription ISSH MDP 1667.

== See also ==
- List of streets and squares in Gamla stan
