= Solgränd =

Alley in Gamla stan, Stockholm, Sweden

Coordinates: 59°19′29.7″N 18°4′12.3″E

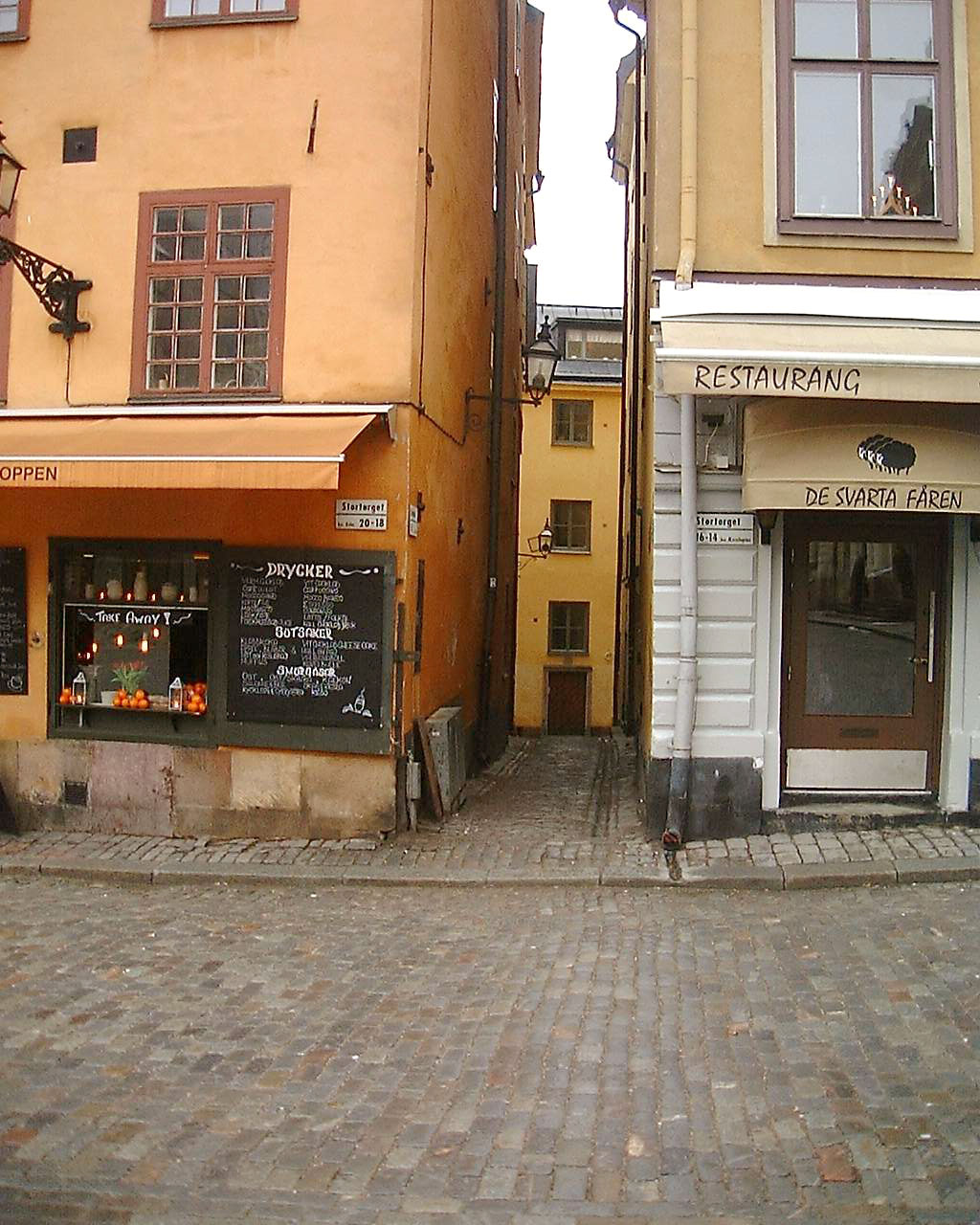
Solgränd in March 2007.

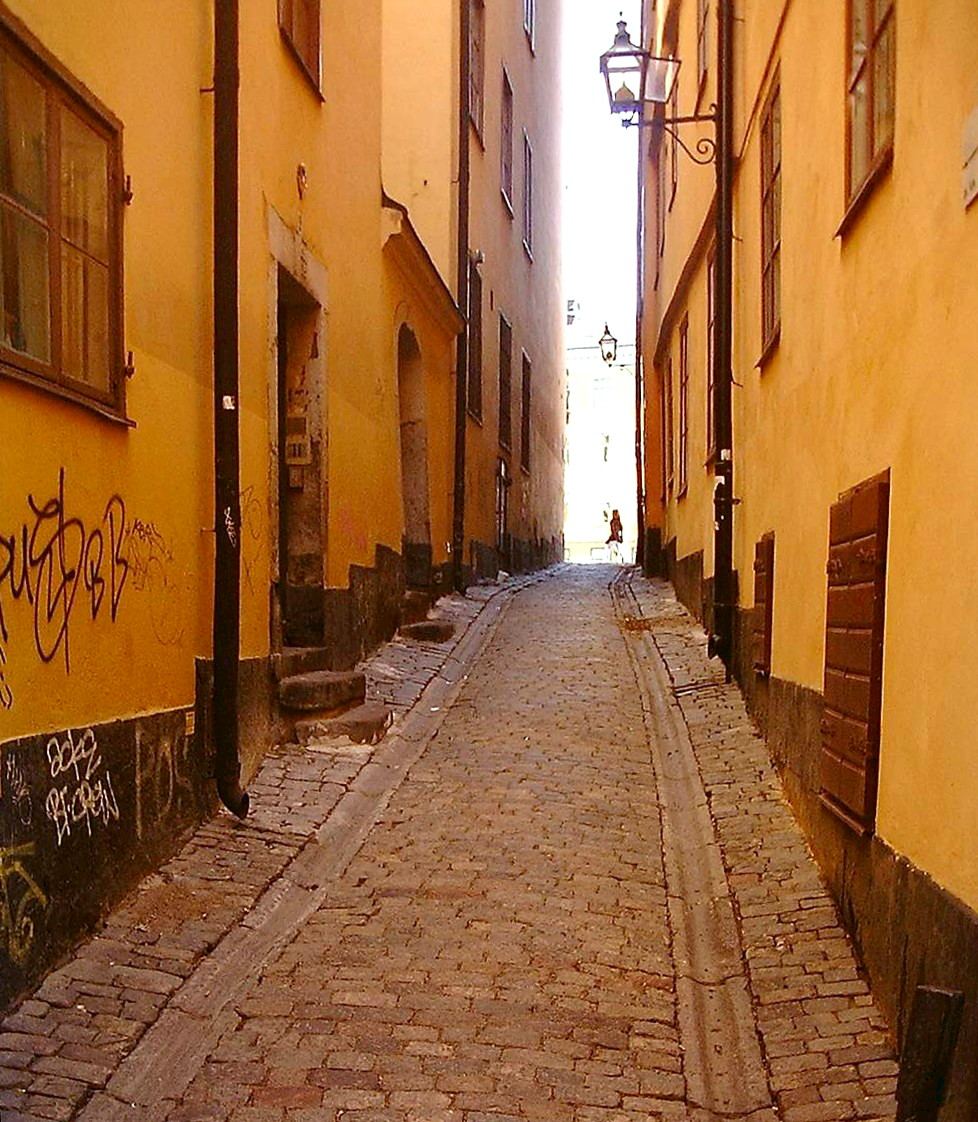
The sun rarely reaches Solgränd. (Photo taken a bright and sunny spring day.)

Solgränd (Swedish: "Sun Alley") is an alley in Gamla stan, the old town of Stockholm, Sweden. It connects the Stortorget square to the street Prästgatan. It is a parallel street to Storkyrkobrinken, Ankargränd, Spektens gränd, and Kåkbrinken.

Solen ("The Sun") was the name of several taverns in Gamla stan, and in a list dated 1671 three taverns and inns are said to bear the name, one of which is called Solen vid Prästgatan ("The Sun at Prästgatan"). A tavern probably located in the corner of Prästgatan gave the alley its name. The popular troubadour Carl Michael Bellman (1740–1795) mentions the alley in his lyrics. The tavern mentioned in his epistle n:o 79 Charon i Luren tutar however, dedicated to a mor Maja Myra i Solgränden vid Stortorget, anno 1785 ("mother Maja Myra in the Solgränd by Stortorget, in the year 1785"), is referring to a tavern next door to Solen, in epistle n.o 56 called Förgyllda Bägaren ("The Gilt Cup").

== See also ==
- List of streets and squares in Gamla stan
