= Trångsund, Stockholm =

Street in Gamla stan, Stockholm, Sweden

Coordinates: 59°19′31″N 18°04′13″E

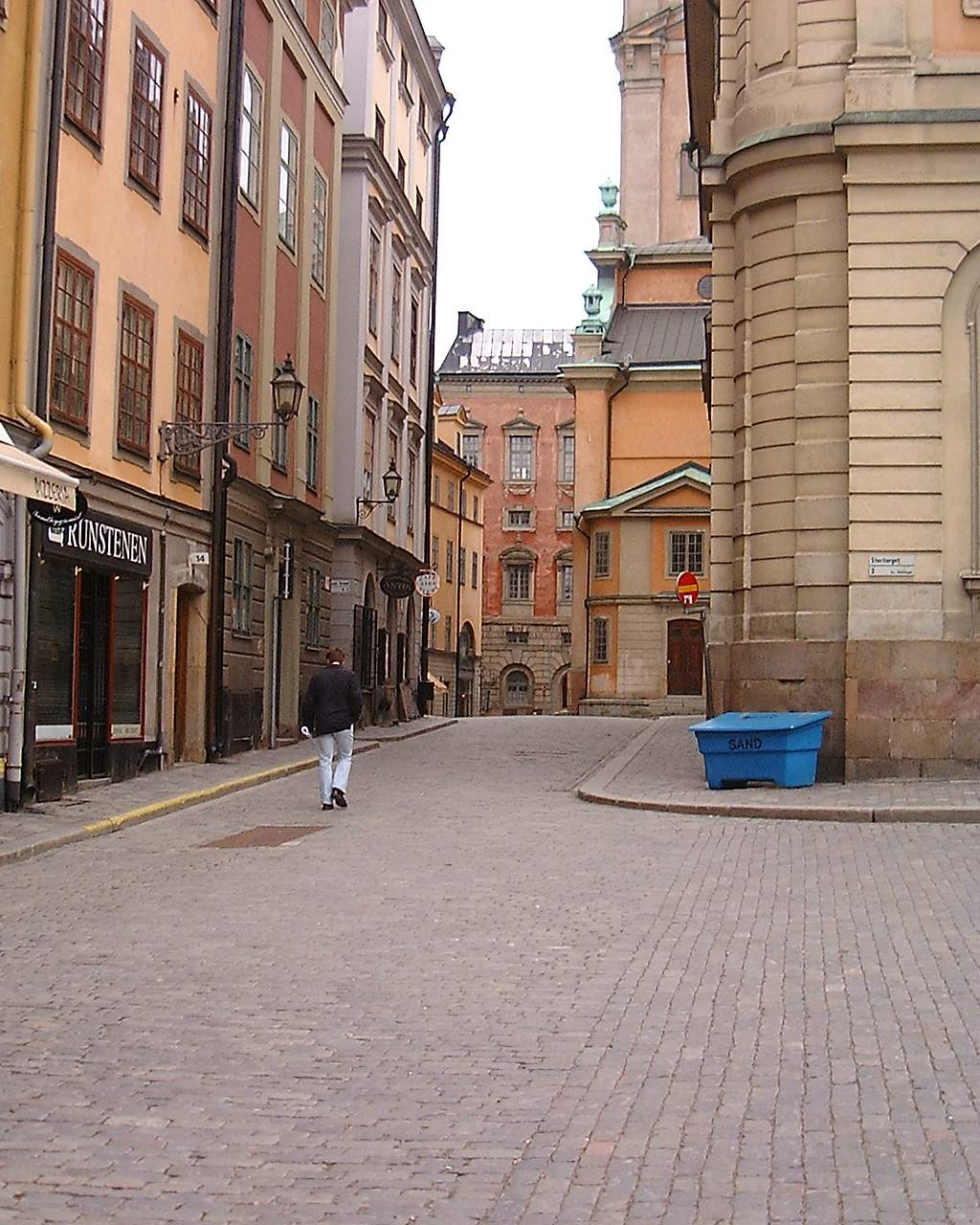
Viewed from Stortorget.

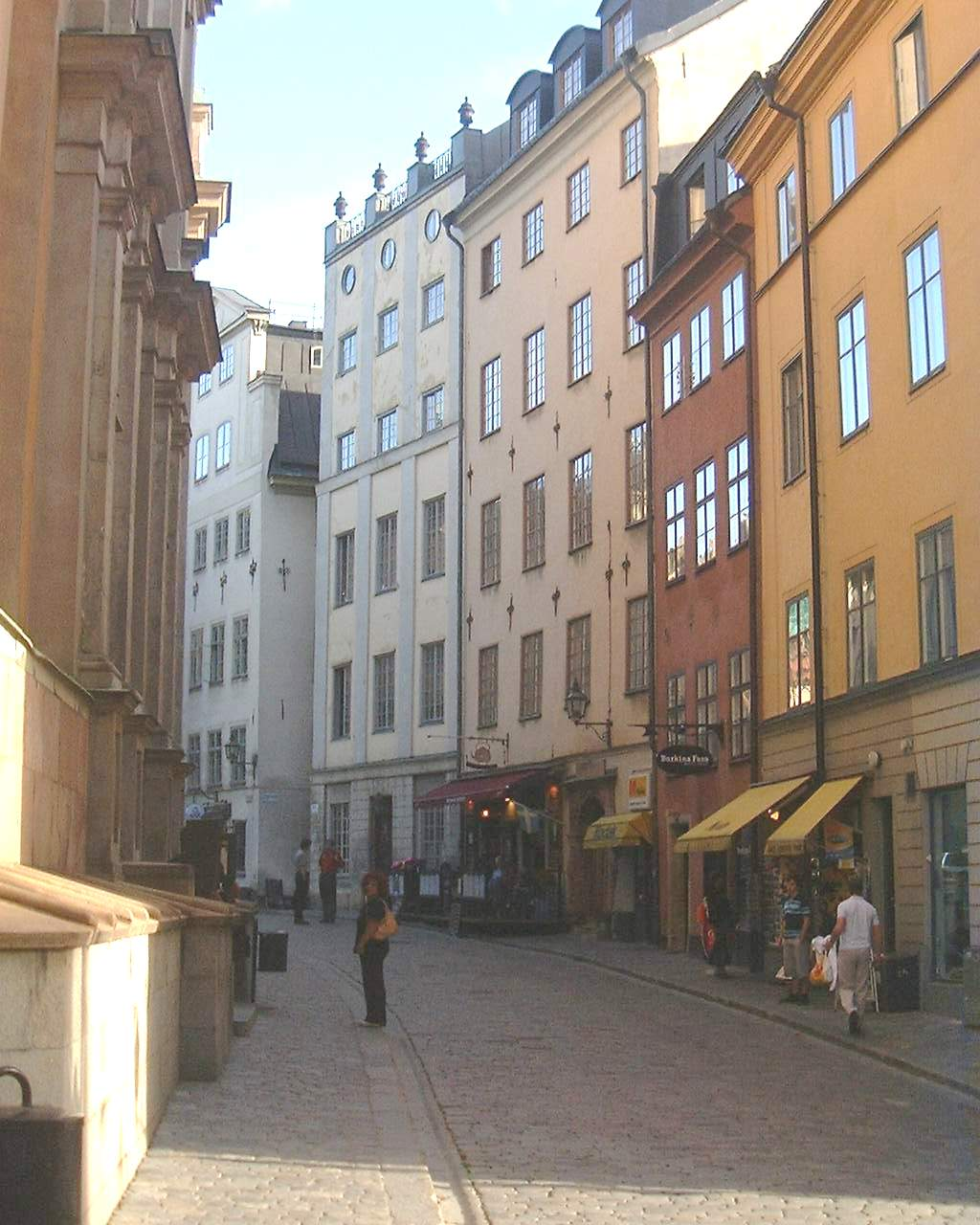
Viewed from Storkyrkobrinken.

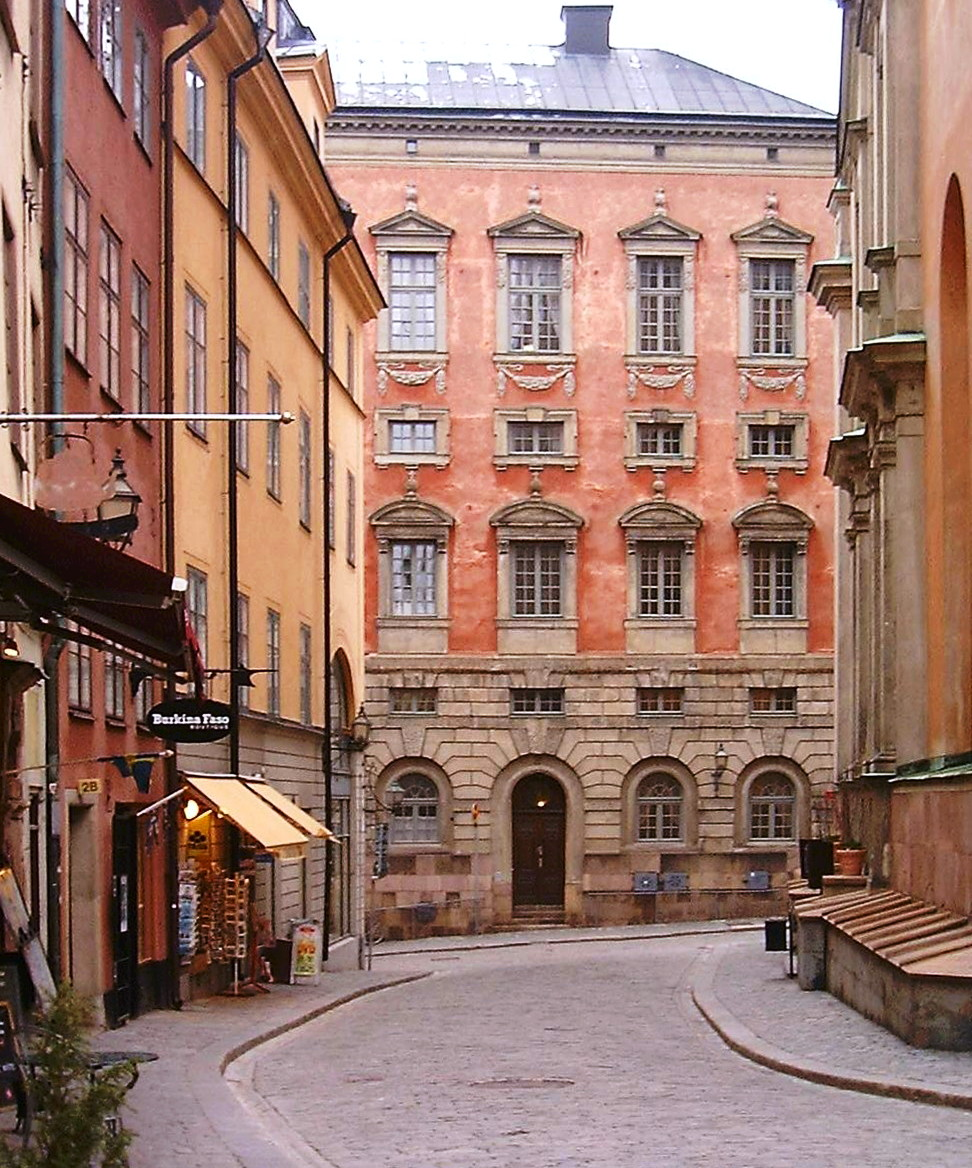
Facade of the Oxenstierna Palace, one of the most well-preserved palaces in the old town.

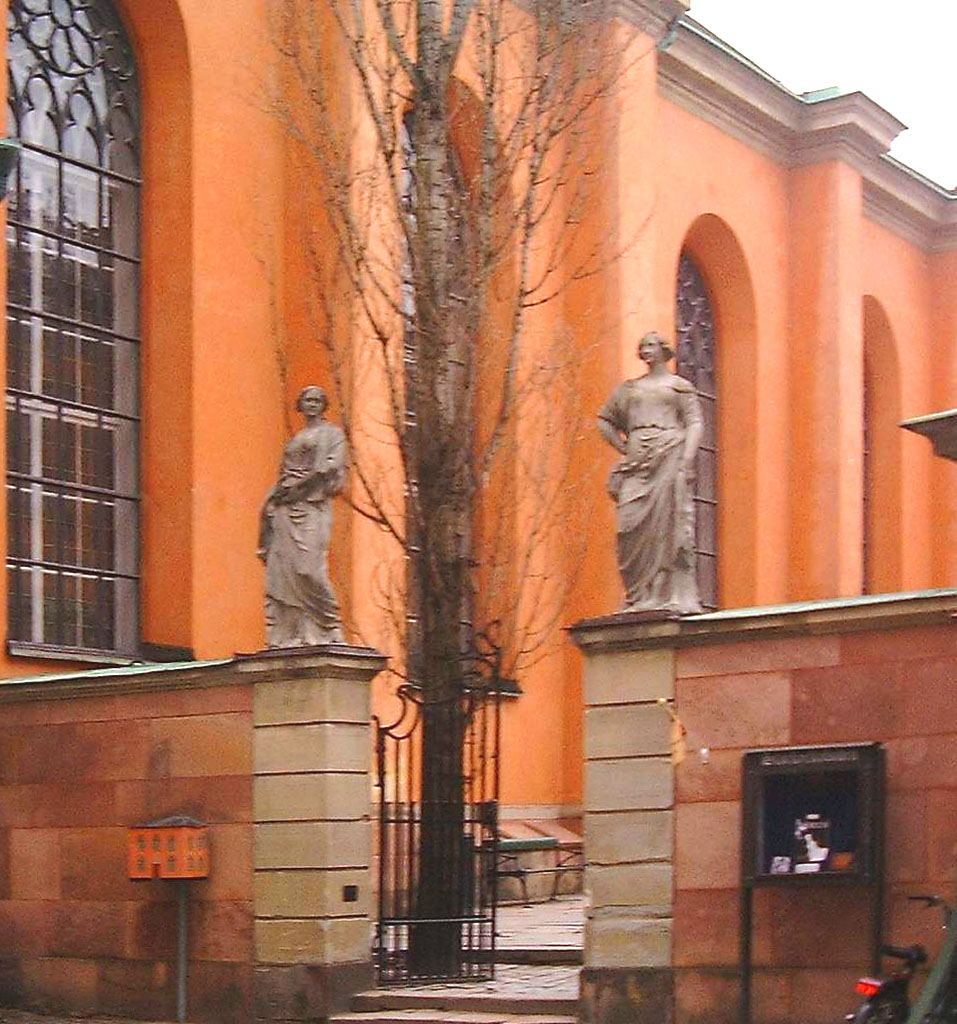
Two sculptures - Reason (Förnuftet) and Heavenly Love (Den gudomliga kärleken) - from the early 18th century flanking the gate to the former graveyard.

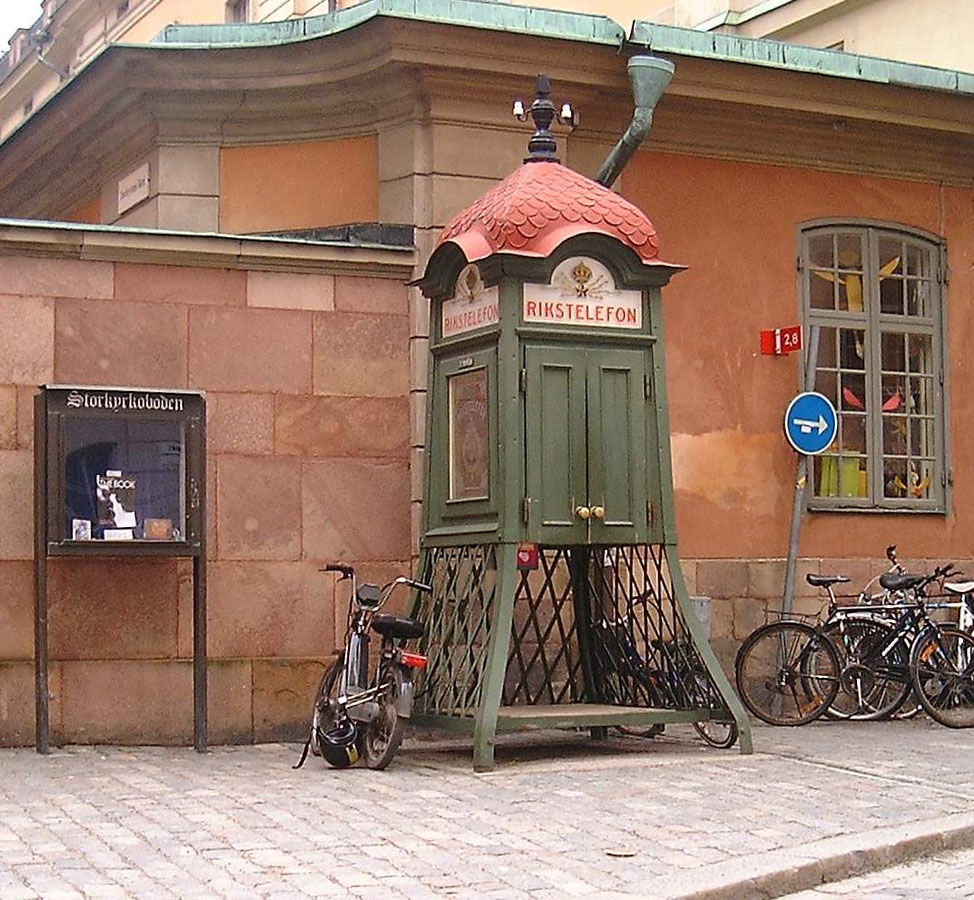
An old phone box.

Trångsund (Swedish for 'Narrow Strait'; Swedish pronunciation: [trɔŋˈsɵnːd];) is a short, narrow street in Gamla stan, the old town of Stockholm, Sweden. Stretching from Stortorget in front of Storkyrkan to Storkyrkobrinken, it is intercepted by Ankargränd and Spektens Gränd and forms a parallel street to Prästgatan and Källargränd.

In the 15th century the name Trångsund was used for a narrow street in the southern end of Gamla stan, possibly Mårten Trotzigs Gränd, but by the end of the 16th century it was used for the formerly nameless alley. As the church used to be surrounded by a graveyard, Trångsund used to be much narrower before both the graveyard and the wall around it were demolished in 1816.

Notable buildings

- Nr 1, Storkyrkan, oldest parts dating from the 12th century.
- Nr 2, Asplundska huset, built in the 1650s.
- Nr 4, Robeckska huset, built during the 17th century, medieval basement.
- Nr 5, Stockholm Stock Exchange Building, built in 1778.
- Nr 6, Stuténska huset, built during the 17th century.
- Nr 10, Sundmanska huset, built in 1638.
- Nr 12, Knorringska huset, built during the 17th century.

== See also ==
- History of Stockholm
- List of streets and squares in Gamla stan
