= Prästgatan =

Street in Gamla stan, Stockholm, Sweden

Coordinates: 59°19′37.3″N 18°04′13.0″E

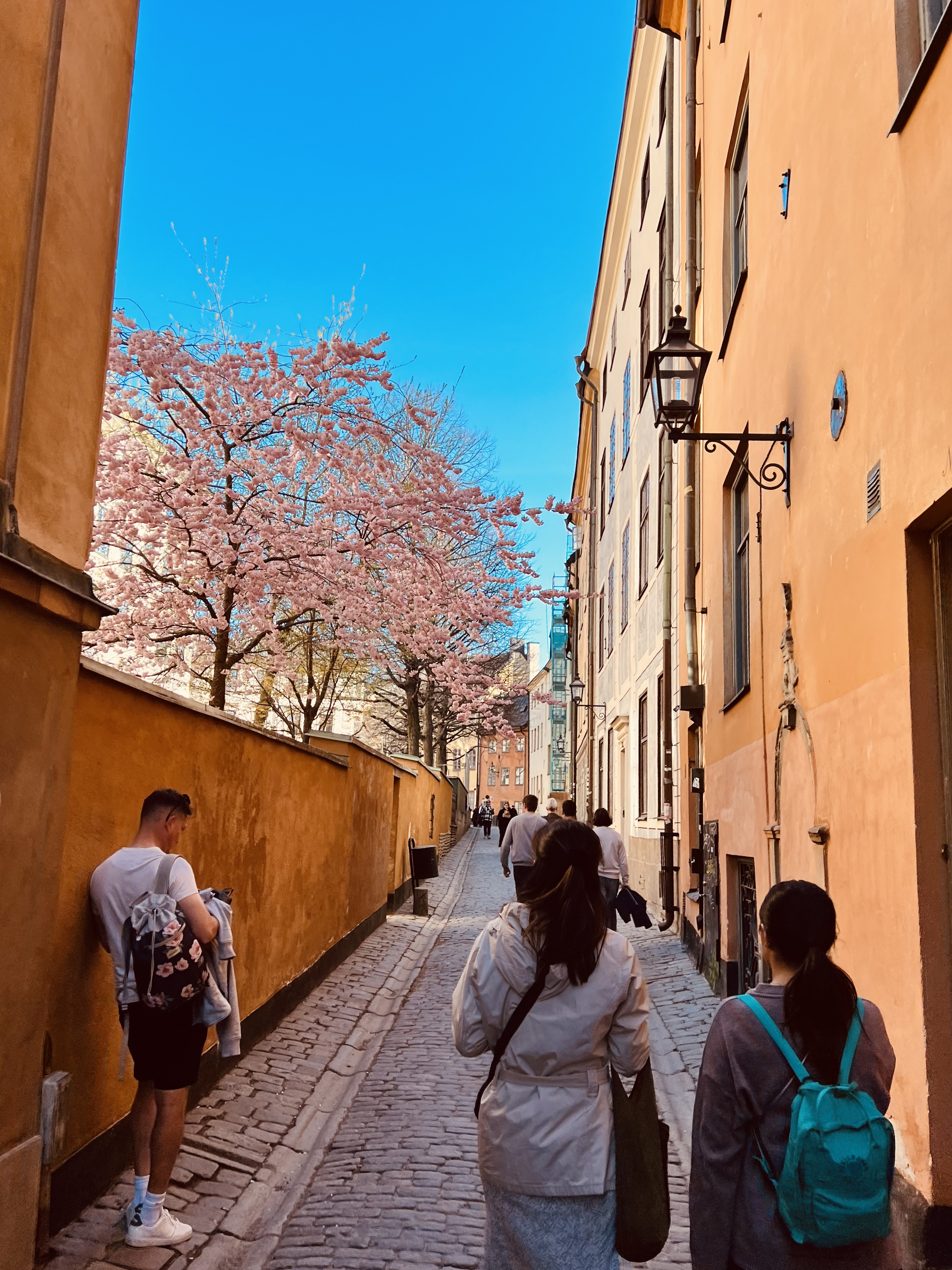
Prästgatan in 2025

Prästgatan (Swedish: "The Priest's Street") is a street in Gamla stan, the old town in central Stockholm, Sweden, stretching from a cul-de-sac west of the Royal Palace to the street Österlånggatan in the southern corner of the old town. Prästgatan forms a parallel street to Västerlånggatan, Trångsund, Skomakargatan, and Svartmangatan. It is intercepted by Storkyrkobrinken, Ankargränd, Spektens Gränd, Solgränd, Kåkbrinken, Tyska brinken, Tyska stallplan, Mårten Trotzigs gränd, and Norra Benickebrinken.

== Old names ==
Prästegathen (1586)

Helwitesgatun (1529), Helgemesse grenden (1646), Helgeandz grenden (1669), Helgonegrenden (1697), Helvichs gränd(1726), Hellwigs gränden, Helvitii gränd (1723), Helvetii Gränd (1821), Helvetiegränden (1885)
sahlig Gref Stenbergs Huus (1700), Stenbergs gr[änd] (1733), Stenbergs gränd (1885)

== History ==
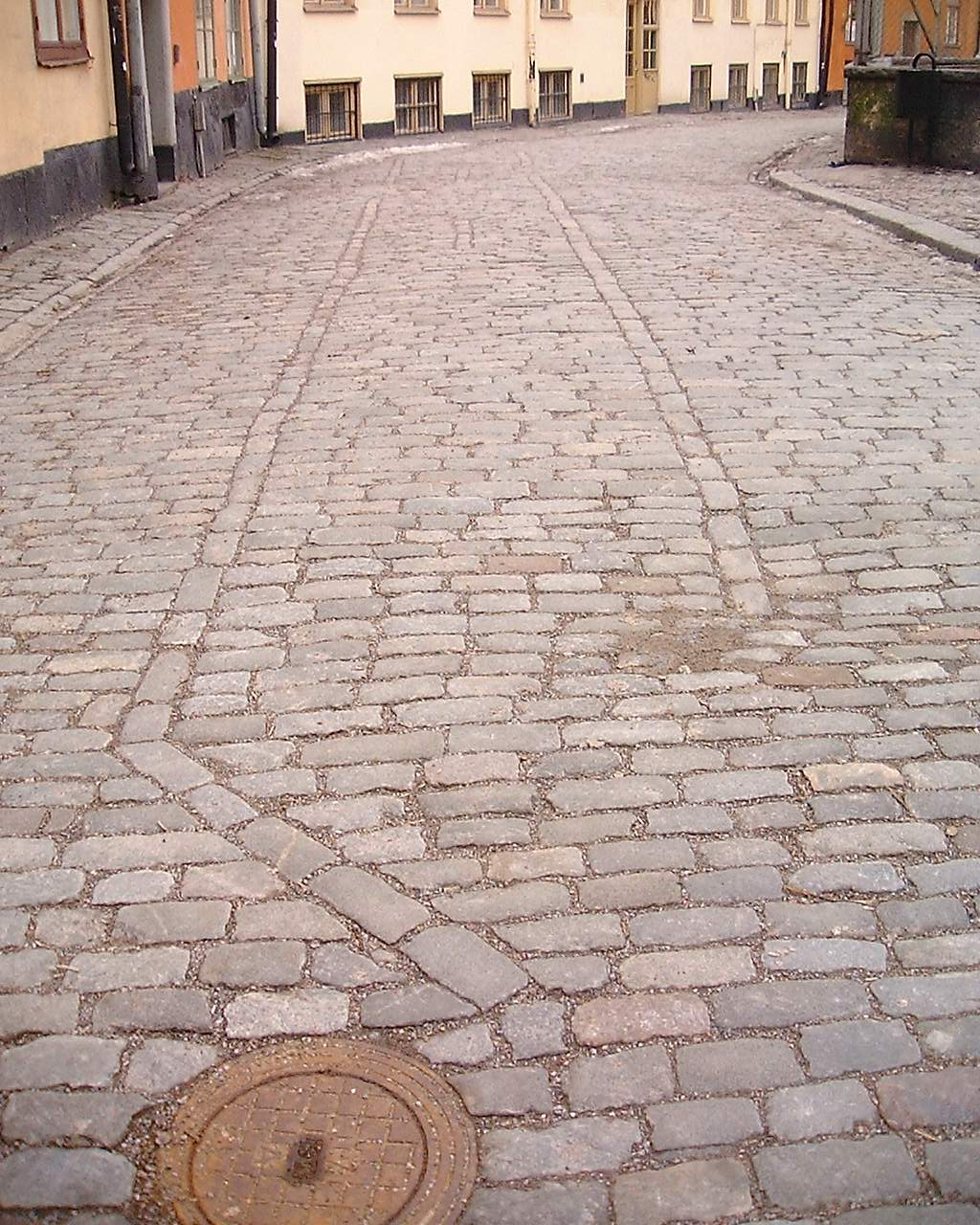
Arrangement of paving stones by Tyska Stallplan showing the extent of the Blackfriars monastery.

The street was given its name because of the residences of three chaplains and a bell-ringer built there during the 16th century. The four small buildings were demolished in 1708 to make room for the parsonage which is still present. Because the parsons of the German Church ("Tyska kyrkan") were housed near the street, the southern part of it was called Tyska Prästgatan ("The German Priest's Street") from the mid-18th to the mid-19th century while the northern part was called Svenska Prästgatan ("The Swedish Priest's Street"). The name revision of 1885, led to the name Prästgatan being used for the street's northern and southern extensions as well.

Before this, the north part of the street Storkyrkobrinken was known as Helvetesgränd ("Alley of Hell"), just like the surrounding area north and west of the cathedral Storkyrkan was referred to as Helvetet (Hell), a name subject to scholarly disputes. Professor Nils Ahnlund (1889–1957), interpreted it as referring to the area north of a church in popular beliefs being known as "latus plagæ damnatæ" ("the northern side of the damned") and therefore a place of disgrace suitable for suicides and criminals, a theory only corroborated by the location of the city executioner in the area. This theory was however questioned in several essays by the historian Lizzie Carlsson, who instead concluded that during the Middle Ages Helvetet was used all over Sweden for farmyards as well as other structures with a northern location. A theory, she argues, is confirmed by the fact that the "kingdom of the dead" in norse folklore is located to the north. While the presence of more distinguished residences in the Helvetet neighbourhood can be explained by the overcrowded conditions within the city walls, the name during medieval times did not have the pejorative meaning it has today, thus making the hypothesis credible.

The extension south of Tyska Stallplan was named Stenbergs gränd ("Alley of Stenberg") after Crown Equerry Antonius von Steinberg (–1675), favourite of Queen Christina (1626–1689) and owner of the entire block north of the extension. The painter Carl Larsson (1853–1919) was born in a building nearby. The arrangement of paving stones in the street on the southern slope show the extent of the Blackfriars monastery located on the northern side of the street from the coronation of King Magnus Eriksson in 1336 to the Reformation (around 1520–1530). An archaeological excavation in 1993 revealed the corner of a wall 0.6 metres under the current street just in front of the corner between Tyska Stallplan and Prästgatan.

== Runestone ==
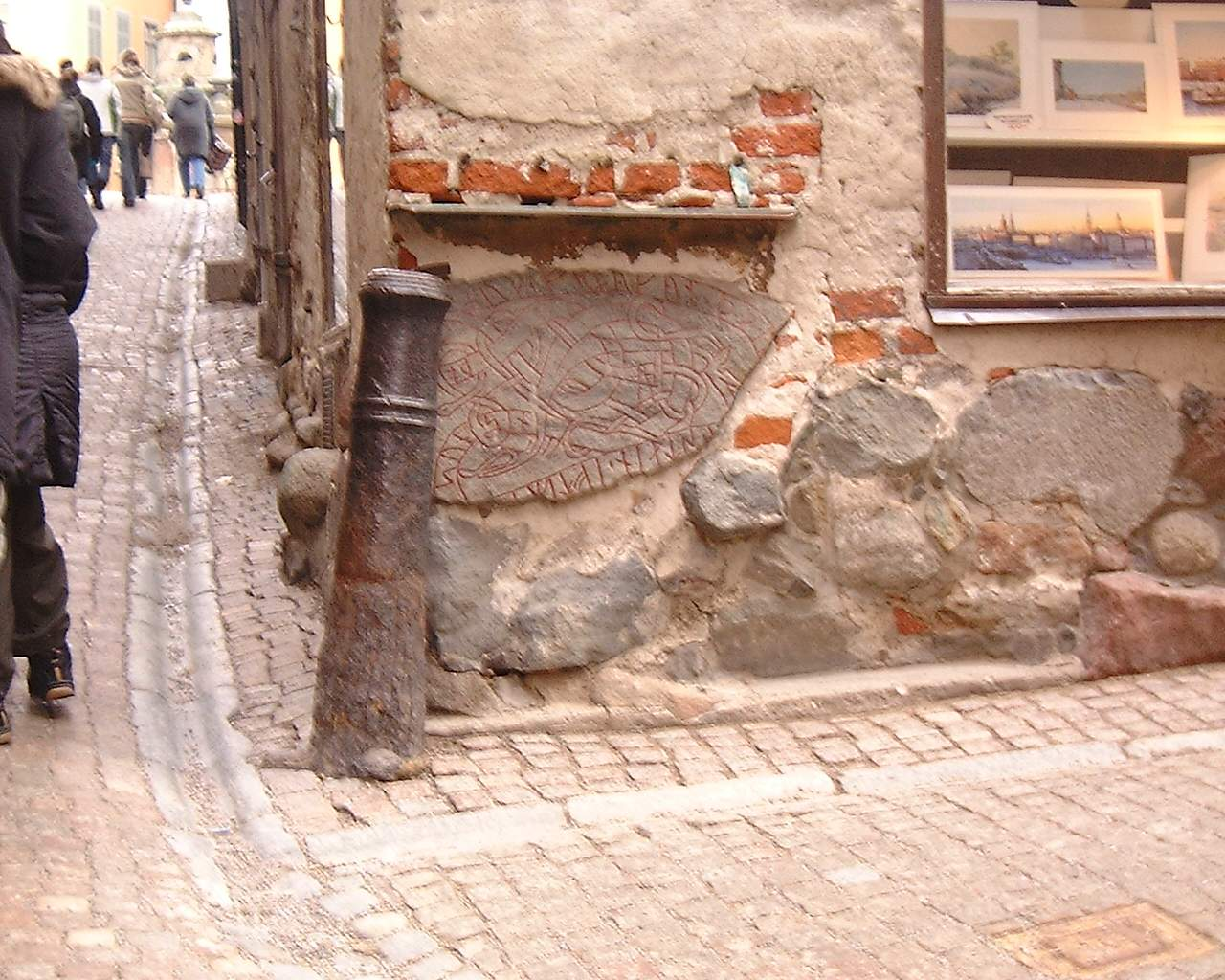
Runestone in the wall at the intersection with Kåkbrinken

In the corner of Prästgatan and Kåkbrinken is a runestone in the wall, carrying the inscription "Torsten and Frögunn had the stone erected after their son." The stone was probably brought to Stockholm to be used as building material, from where is not known. As the female name Frögunn is known as a pagan name, the stone is believed to be from around 1000, the stone thus being about 200 years older than the city.

A laser range scanner analysis made in 2002, showed variations in stroke patterns in the grooves of the stone, and that the stone was probably carved by a master carver and an apprentice. It's one of three runestones found in the old town: A second, U 274, originally located in a wall by the southern city gate near Slussen, is today kept in the Museum of Medieval Stockholm. It contains the words "Karl and Adisla had [this stone] erected [after] Arnsil, [their] father" and is similar in style to stones found in Södermanland, south of Stockholm. The third runestone, U 54, is today lost but was once located in a stairway in the church Riddarholmskyrkan.

== See also ==
- List of streets and squares in Gamla stan
