= Ferdinand Zellbell the Younger =

Swedish composer (1719–1780)

Ferdinand Zellbell the Younger (1719 – 21 April 1780) was a Swedish composer and a founding member of the Royal Swedish Academy of Music. He was organist at Storkyrkan, the main church of Stockholm, and chief conductor at Kungliga Hovkapellet (the Royal Court Orchestra). Arguably his most accomplished composition is an opera, Il Giudizio d'Aminta, written on the occasion of the birthday of future Empress Catherine the Great of Russia.

== Biography ==
Ferdinand Zellbell the Younger was born in Stockholm. He was the son of Ferdinand Zellbell the Elder, who was also a musician and a composer. He was taught music by his father but also studied for Johan Helmich Roman. He spent the years between 1739 and 1741 with further studies in Lower Saxony; his teachers there included Georg Philipp Telemann. He started working as a substitute for his father as an organist in Storkyrkan, the main church of Stockholm, and from 1753 was permanently employed there. His father also helped him secure a position as a musician at the royal court, and he eventually rose to the position of chief conductor at Kungliga Hovkapellet and concertmaster, but this work was largely without a salary. Only from 1758 did he receive payment for his services to the court. The same year he became a member of the Freemasons and in 1763 he joined Timmermansorden (The Worshipful Company of Carpenters).

In 1758–59, he traveled to Saint Petersburg. There he received the commission to write the music for the opera Il Giudizio Di'Aminta (with text by Lodovico Lazaroni), performed as part of the celebrations of the birthday of the future Empress Catherine. Invigorated by this success, Zellbell pursued his musical career with more energy on his return to Stockholm. During the 1760s and 1770s he organised many concerts, especially in the House of Nobility, which at the time was a popular concert venue. Il Giudizio Di'Aminta was performed there again in 1759 and 1760, and in 1767 he organised a concert in memory of his former teacher Roman. In 1771 he was also one of the co-founders of the Royal Swedish Academy of Music, and the only of the co-founders who was a professional musician. He was active as a teacher at the academy following its foundation. In 1778 he organised a concert in Stockholm for the last time. He died impoverished in his native city in 1780, "but left a violin, some keyboard instruments, a collection of scores and an important book collection." He also left a legacy through his work as a teacher. Perhaps his most successful student was Olof Åhlström.

== Works ==
The opera Il Giudizio d'Aminta has been described as Zellbell's most accomplished work. He wrote an opera-ballet, Sveas Högtid eller De fria konsternas vördnadsoffer åt dygderna (with libretto by Gustaf Fredrik Gyllenborg), but only the overture has been preserved. He wrote several cantatas, some music for orchestra as well as a few pieces for organ and keyboard. His style is very similar to that of his father, and it is sometimes difficult to differentiate between the two. They share a style "marked by the transition from baroque to gallant style, with baroque features in the church music, in pompous introductory movements to cantatas and fugue parts in the symphonies." Some of the works attributed to him have turned out to be by other composers, e.g. Roman and Andrea Bernasconi.
