= Storkyrkan =

Cathedral in Stockholm, Sweden

- Stockholms domkyrka Sankt Nikolai domkyrka
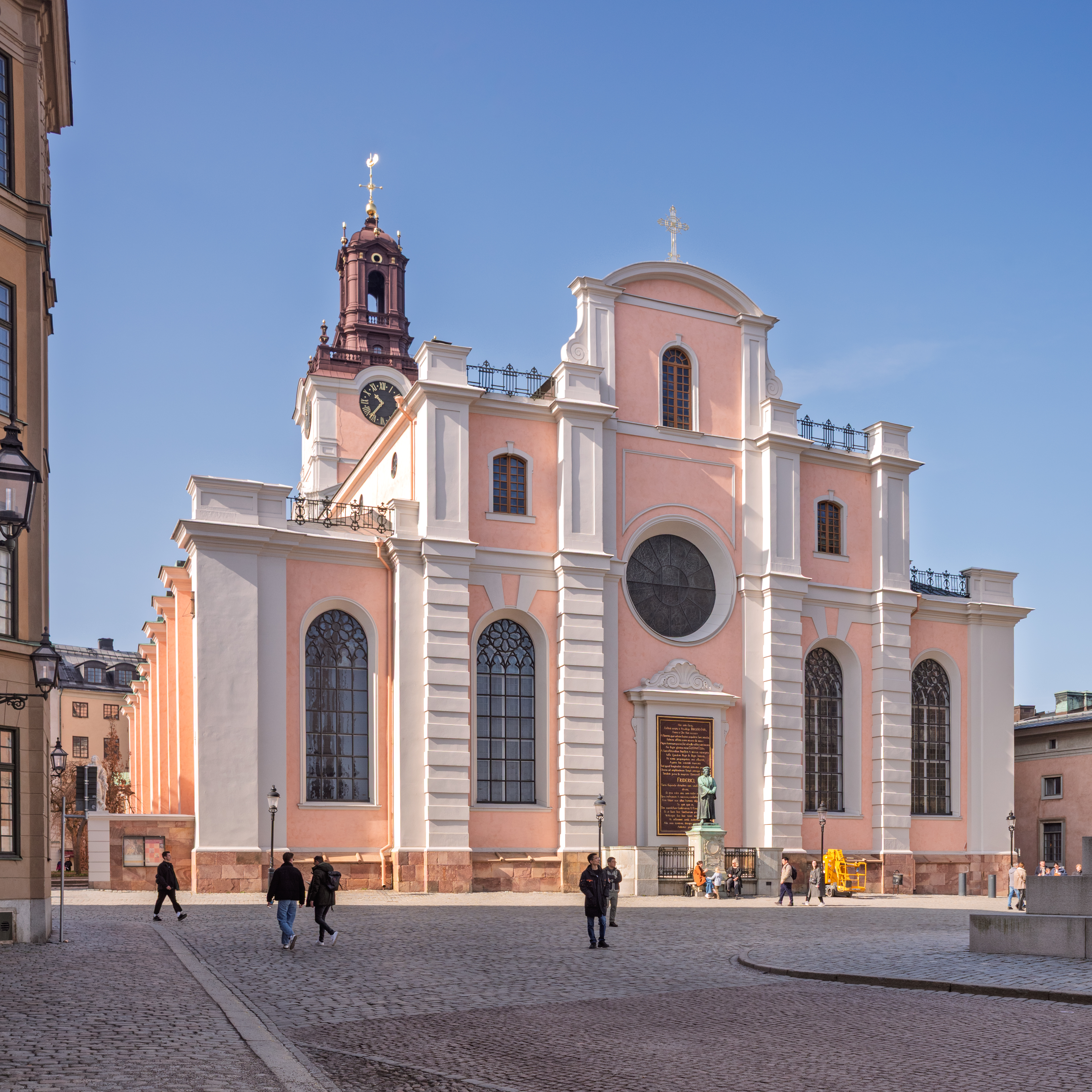
- East facade of Storkyrkan, facing Slottsbacken
- Storkyrkan
- 59°19′33″N 18°04′14″E
- Location: Stockholm
- Country: Sweden
- Denomination: Church of Sweden
- Previous denomination: Roman Catholic
- Website: Website of Storkyrkan

History
- Status: Active
- Founded: 13th century
- Dedication: Saint Nicholas
- Consecrated: 1306

Architecture
- Functional status: Cathedral & Parish church

Specifications
- Length: 63 metres (207 ft)
- Width: 37.2 metres (122 ft)
- Height: 60.4 metres (198 ft) (to the top of the tower)

Administration
- Diocese: Stockholm

Clergy
- Bishop: Andreas Holmberg

Storkyrkan (Swedish: [ˈstûːrˌɕʏrkan], lit. 'The Great Church'), also called Stockholms domkyrka (Stockholm Cathedral) and Sankt Nikolai kyrka (Church of Saint Nicholas), is the oldest church in Stockholm. Storkyrkan lies in the centre of Stockholm in Gamla stan, between Stockholm Palace and Stortorget, the old main square of Stockholm. It was dedicated to Saint Nicholas in 1306 but construction of the church probably started in the 13th century. Inside, Storkyrkan still maintains much of its late medieval appearance in the form of a hall church with a vaulted ceiling supported by brick pillars. The exterior of the church is however uniformly Baroque in appearance, the result of extensive changes made in the 18th century. The church played an important role during the Reformation in Sweden as the place where Mass was celebrated in Swedish for the first time. It currently serves as the seat of the Bishop of Stockholm within the Church of Sweden since the creation of the Diocese of Stockholm in 1942.

Storkyrkan was for a long time the only parish church of Stockholm, and from an early date it was connected with the Swedish royal family. It has been the scene of historical events on numerous occasions, and was used as a coronation church for centuries. More recently, the wedding between Crown Princess Victoria and Daniel Westling took place in the church in 2010. Military victories as well as national tragedies have been commemorated in Storkyrkan, and it is still used for funerals of public figures such as the writers Astrid Lindgren and Sara Danius.

The church contains several important works of art as well as elaborate furnishings, among these a late medieval sculpture of Saint George and the Dragon and Vädersolstavlan, a painting which shows one of the earliest images of Stockholm.

== Location and surroundings ==
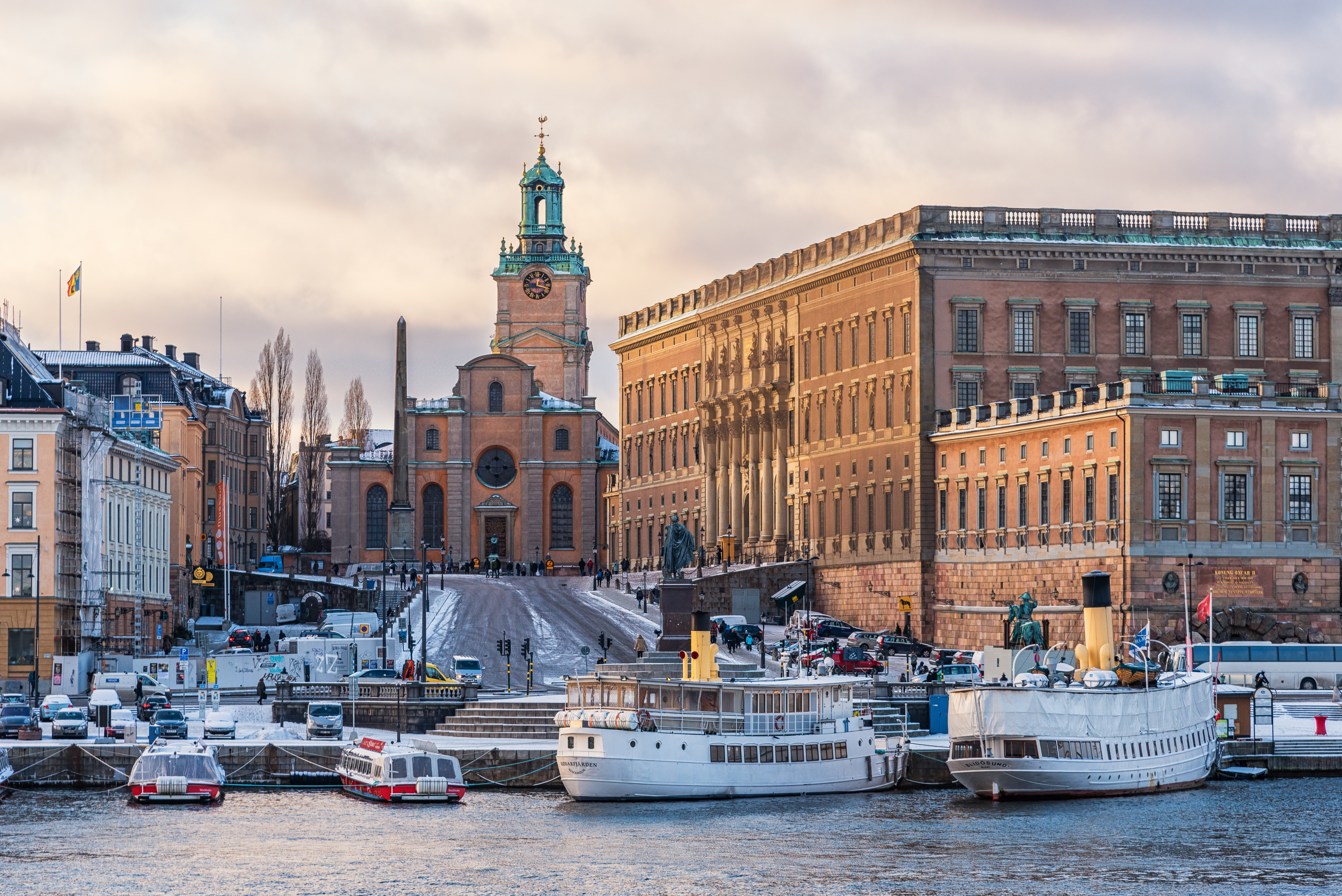
Storkyrkan visible at the end of Slottsbacken from across the water. The church is part of a coherent ensemble of Baroque architecture surrounding Stockholm Palace (visible to the right).

Storkyrkan is the oldest church in Stockholm and was originally the parish church of the entire city, and as such was built at the very centre of the medieval city. It lies at the highest point of Gamla stan, wedged between the Stock Exchange Building and Stockholm Palace. The church, together with the palace, Stortorget and the first town hall of Stockholm (located on the site of the present stock exchange building), formed the heart of the earliest urban development. While the interior of the church still retains much of its medieval appearance, the exterior of the church is largely the result of changes made in the 18th century. Together with the Royal Palace, the Axel Oxenstierna palace, Slottsbacken and its obelisk, and the Tessin Palace, it is part of a coherent ensemble of Baroque architecture. It has been described as an "irreplaceable" part of the cityscape of Stockholm.

Storkyrkan is surrounded on three sides by streets (Trångsund to the west, Storkyrkobrinken and Högvaktsterrassen to the north and Slottsbacken to the east). A courtyard is located immediately south of the church. On the opposite side the courtyard faces the back of the stock exchange buildings, and two small pavilions, designed by Erik Palmstedt as wings of the stock exchange, were actually built as the burial chapel and coach-house of the church. They were built in 1767. To the west and east the courtyard is limited by walls, with openings through wrought iron gates. The posts of both gates were originally decorated with allegorical statues, although only the couple on the west gate are still in place. These two statues probably depict Reason (on the south post) and Divine Love (on the north post), and were made by Peter Schultz in 1675. The statues formerly on the posts of the east gate depict females symbolising Caution and Hope. The pair was made in 1702 by Daniel Kortz.

Another statue, depicting the Swedish reformer Olaus Petri, stands adjacent to the east facade of the church. It faces Slottsbacken and forms part of the church ensemble even though it is not formally connected to Storkyrkan. It was inaugurated in 1898 and made by Theodor Lundberg. In the pavement next to the east facade there are also lines which mark the former extent of a church choir, demolished during the reign of King Gustav Vasa.

== History of the building ==
=== Middle Ages ===
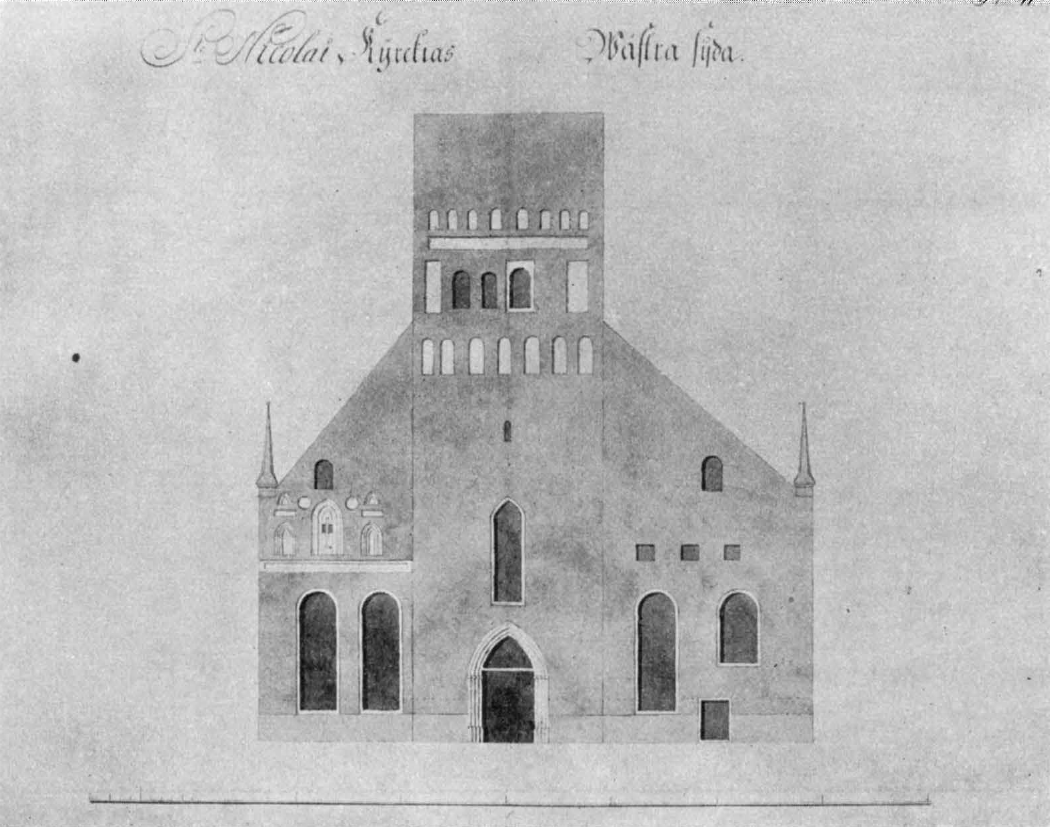
The west facade of Storkyrkan as it appeared in 1732, showing its still largely medieval exterior.

The presence of a church in Stockholm was indicated for the first time in 1279. The consecration of the city church is furthermore mentioned in 1306, making Storkyrkan the oldest church in Stockholm. The earliest history of the church is thus somewhat unclear: Stockholm was founded in the middle of the 13th century and it has been considered unlikely that the city would not have a functioning church until 1306. Tradition also holds that Birger Jarl founded the church. It is therefore possible that the church inaugurated in 1306 was preceded by another church, or that it was under construction for a long time, or perhaps re-dedicated in 1306. Regardless, the oldest parts of the current building probably belong to the church which was inaugurated in 1306. During the entire Middle Ages, the main patron saint of the church was Saint Nicholas. Several churches in the Baltic region from the 13th century are dedicated to Saint Nicholas, especially in cities where the Hanseatic League had a presence, as was the case in Stockholm. The church was also dedicated to Saint Mary and Saint Eric. The church remained the only parish church of Stockholm, serving the entire city, until the 1590s. In general, the medieval history of the church building is complex and difficult to determine in detail. There are few written sources, and a lack of ornaments has made it difficult to draw any conclusions about the age of the different parts on stylistic grounds.

Originally, the church appears to have consisted of a nave with two aisles. It had a wooden ceiling supported by six pillars. The building material was brick. The main entrance was probably located to the west, though side entrances may have existed in the north and south walls. Stylistically, the church was part of a group of brick churches built in the area around Lake Mälaren at the time, including Strängnäs Cathedral, St. Mary's Church, Sigtuna and Skokloster Church. The church was successively rebuilt and enlarged during the 14th and 15th centuries. Embellishing the church was a way for both the monarchs of Sweden and the citizens of Stockholm to demonstrate their power and influence.

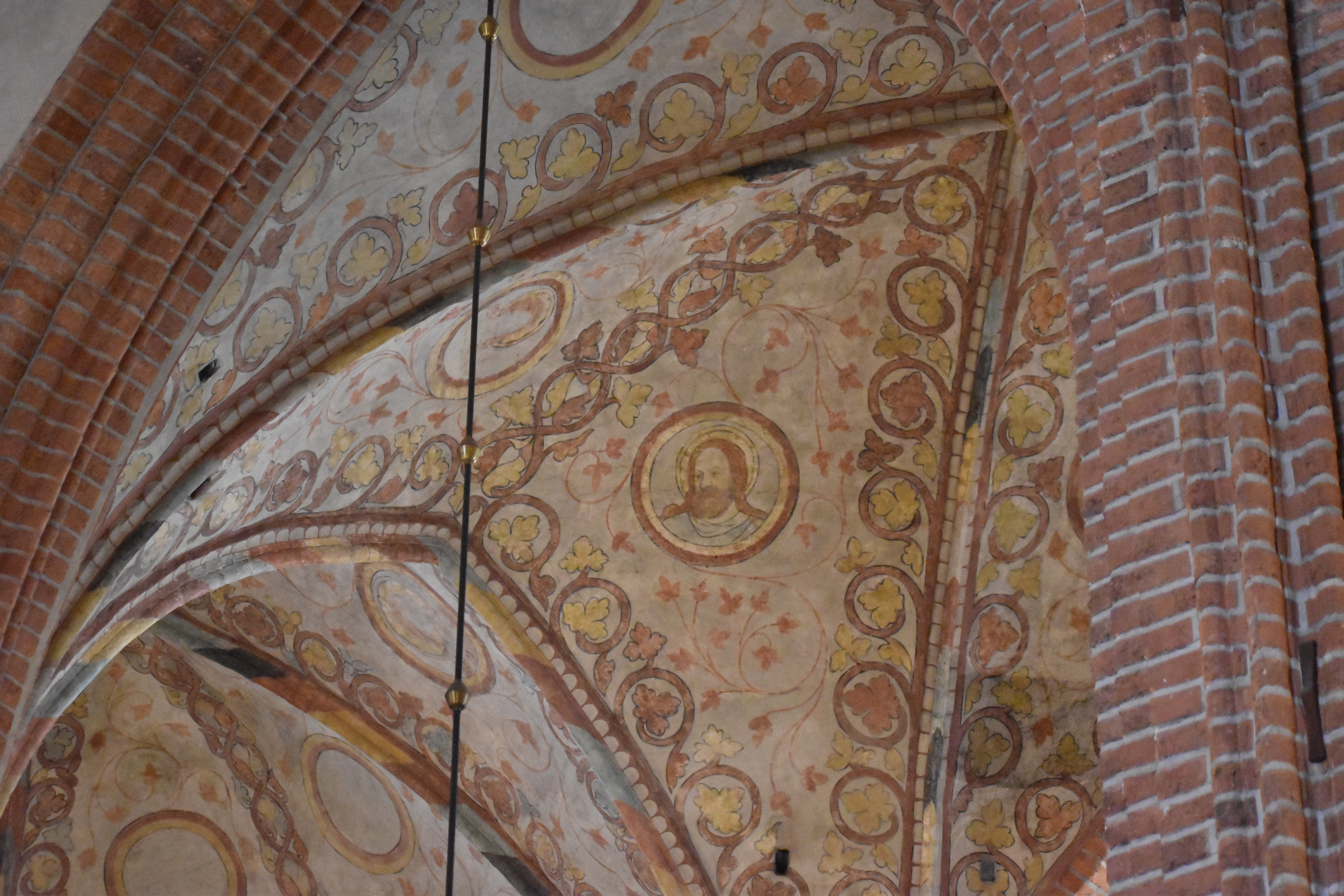
Medieval vault paintings from c. 1346 (later restored) in what used to be the first chapel of the church, dedicated to Saint Mary.

A donation to the church in 1346 by King Magnus IV and his wife Blanche of Namur probably indicates that the first of a number of chapels had been added to the church. This chapel was originally dedicated to Saint Mary and was located at the south side of the east end of the church. The four bays that belonged to the chapel are still discernible in the interior of Storkyrkan. Similar chapels were built at approximately the same time at Visby Cathedral and St. Mary's Church, Lübeck. The chapel was decorated with Early Gothic murals in a style unusual for Swedish churches (later heavily restored). A second chapel was added to the church sometime before 1361, and further chapels were built during the early 15th century. By the end of the Middle Ages, Storkyrkan contained more than 30 chapels or specifically dedicated altarpieces, an amount only comparable with the cathedrals of medieval Sweden. The church thus grew piecemeal by the addition of chapels. Another set of murals, painted by Albertus Pictor and decorating the south west vaults (the paintings are currently not visible from the floor of the church) was also added during the 15th century. Between 1474 and 1496, a major reconstruction of the church was carried out which then incorporated these chapels into a single, unified space and installed new vaults, creating a uniformly high ceiling. The church was at approximately the same time also substantially expanded toward the east, while a choir was also added. This was partially because the church had become too small for the growing population of the city. The choir was demolished during the 16th century. The tower was also built in the early 15th century and was originally intended mainly as a defensive tower. By the end of the 15th century Storkyrkan had acquired the basic shape and size that it still has.

=== Reformation and later changes ===
During the 16th century, the Reformation in Sweden led to important changes for the church. Catholicism was abandoned and Lutheranism was adopted. The state confiscated much of the property of the church, including large amounts of silver from the chapels and altars of Storkyrkan. Although Lutheran Sweden as a whole did not suffer from any extensive outbreaks of iconoclasm during the Reformation as occurred in other parts of Europe, some of the formerly Catholic sculptures of the church were vandalised. When Christian II of Denmark resided in Stockholm in 1520, the church was fortified, a reflection of the political tensions which, among other things, led to the Stockholm Bloodbath in 1521. Adam van Düren was responsible for these works, and he also made an allegorical sculpture adorning the base of one of the pillars of the church. It depicts a male and a female lion and an eel, together with a satirical inscription of dubious meaning. Some further changes to the pillars, vaults and walls of the church were made during the reign of King John III in order to further harmonise the interior space.

=== Changes during the 18th century ===
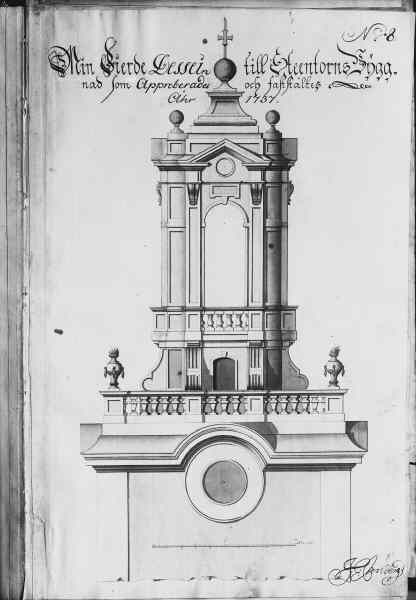
The fourth and final proposal by Carlberg for a new church spire

During the 18th century, the facade of Storkyrkan underwent far-reaching changes. The medieval exterior was completely transformed into a Baroque exterior. Nicodemus Tessin the Younger had put forward a proposal to remake the facade in a more contemporary style. In 1736, Johan Eberhard Carlberg was employed to oversee repairs of the church tower. Relatively soon, the commission expanded to a complete overhaul of the exterior and a new tower spire. Both Carlberg and Carl Hårleman, who had succeeded Nicodemus Tessin the Younger as architect of the Royal Palace, instantly produced numerous proposals for a new tower spire, further indicating that the idea of modernising the exterior had been entertained for some time. Particularly Hårleman seems to have viewed the issue from the standpoint that the church should be stylistically incorporated in the palace surroundings. The two architects accused each other's designs for the church spire to have technical problems. In the end, Carlberg's fourth proposal for a new spire, which was a compromise between his own and Hårleman's ideas, was adopted and Carlberg also designed the other changes to the facade. This transformation of the exterior of the church from a Gothic to a Baroque building was carried out between 1736 and 1745. The exterior seen today is still largely the result of Carlberg's work.

Further changes were made later in the same century, when architect Erik Palmstedt in 1777 redesigned the south side of the church courtyard in connection with the building of the stock exchange building on Stortorget. At the same time, he also designed the stairwell attached to the south side of the tower, at the west end of the church; the stairwell was finished in 1778. These and some other additions, later demolished, further underlined the Classical appearance of the church and its surroundings, in contrast to its medieval roots. King Gustav III of Sweden wanted to go even further, demolish the entire church and replace it with a new church inspired by the Pantheon in Rome.

=== Later history ===
The windows were equipped with new, wrought-iron tracery in Neo-Gothic style in the 1860s. Some further changes, not least in order to increase the fire safety of the church, were carried out during the late 19th century. A more thorough renovation was done in 1903–1909 under the guidance of architect Ernst Stenhammar. Among other things, the whitewash which had covered the brick pillars and walls was removed, and the interior has been characterised by the exposed brick since then. It was done as an attempt to recreate a more "medieval" interior, but in fact the interior had probably always been whitewashed. Another comprehensive renovation was carried out 1952–54. The church was raised to the status of cathedral for the newly formed Diocese of Stockholm in 1942.

== Historical significance and royal connections ==
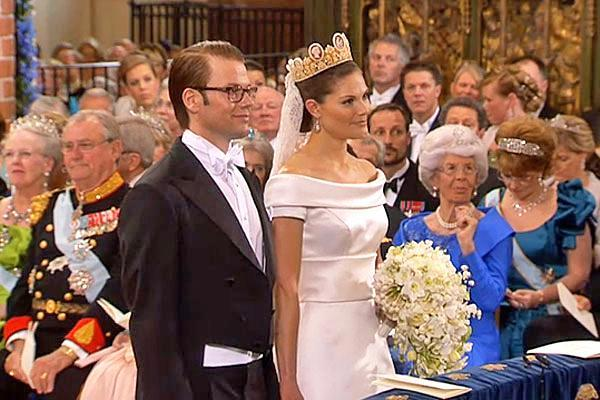
The wedding of Victoria, Crown Princess of Sweden, and Daniel Westling in Storkyrkan in 2010

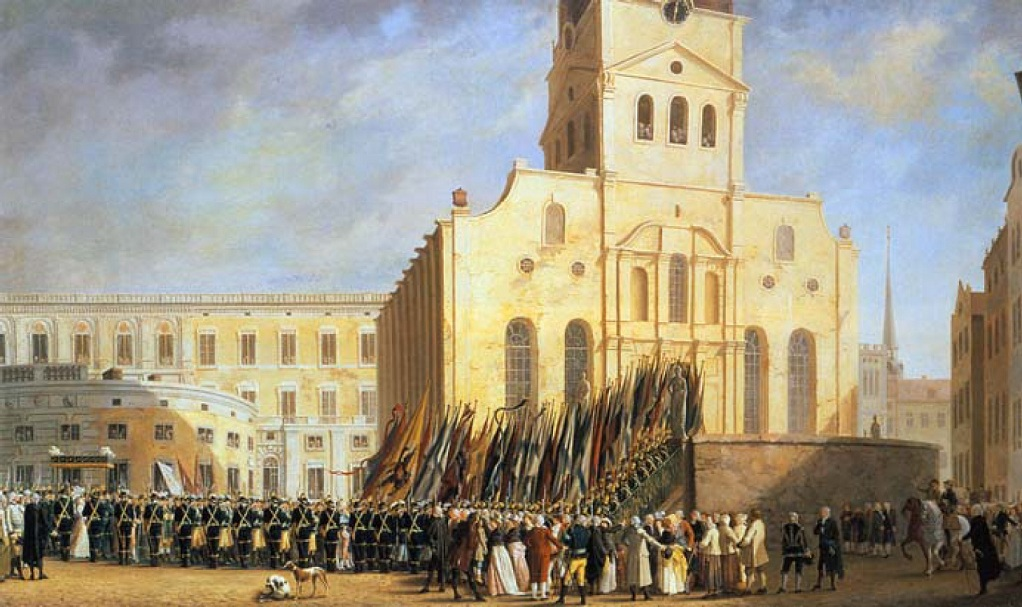
Trophies from the Battle of Svensksund carried into Storkyrkan (1790), painting by Pehr Hilleström

Storkyrkan has been the venue of important events in the history of Sweden. The growing wealth and influence of Stockholm during the Middle Ages, and the church's vicinity to the Royal Palace, attracted the attention of both the Archbishop of Uppsala and the monarchs of Sweden. The archbishop occasionally appointed a special representative to the church, and frequently intervened in local church matters. On at least one occasion, in 1338, a bishop (Hemming of Turku) was ordained in Storkyrkan.

The Reformation in Sweden was at least partly born in Storkyrkan: it was here that Lutheranism was publicly preached for the first time in Sweden and Storkyrkan was at the same time the first church in Sweden where Mass was celebrated in Swedish (instead of Latin), in 1525. One of the main advocates of the Reformation in Sweden, Olaus Petri, then served as a priest in Storkyrkan. As Storkyrkan from then on was used exclusively by the Swedish-speaking congregation of Stockholm, the sizeable German and Finnish-speaking congregations also moved out to the German Church and a chapel in the town hall, respectively.

The church has been used for the coronation of kings and queens of Sweden on several occasions. The first royal coronation that took place in Storkyrkan was the coronation of Magnus IV and Blanche of Namur in 1336. The coronation was conducted by Engelbert von Dolen, Bishop of Tartu, in the presence of all Swedish bishops. Most medieval coronations however took place in Uppsala Cathedral. The next time a coronation took place in Storkyrkan was in 1497, when King John was crowned King of Sweden there, during the Kalmar Union. His son Christian II of Denmark was crowned in Storkyrkan on 4 November 1521 in a ceremony designed to mark the submission of Sweden to the rule of King Christian. During the ceremony, representatives of Emperor Charles V presented the king with the Order of the Golden Fleece. Just a few days later, the Stockholm Bloodbath took place.

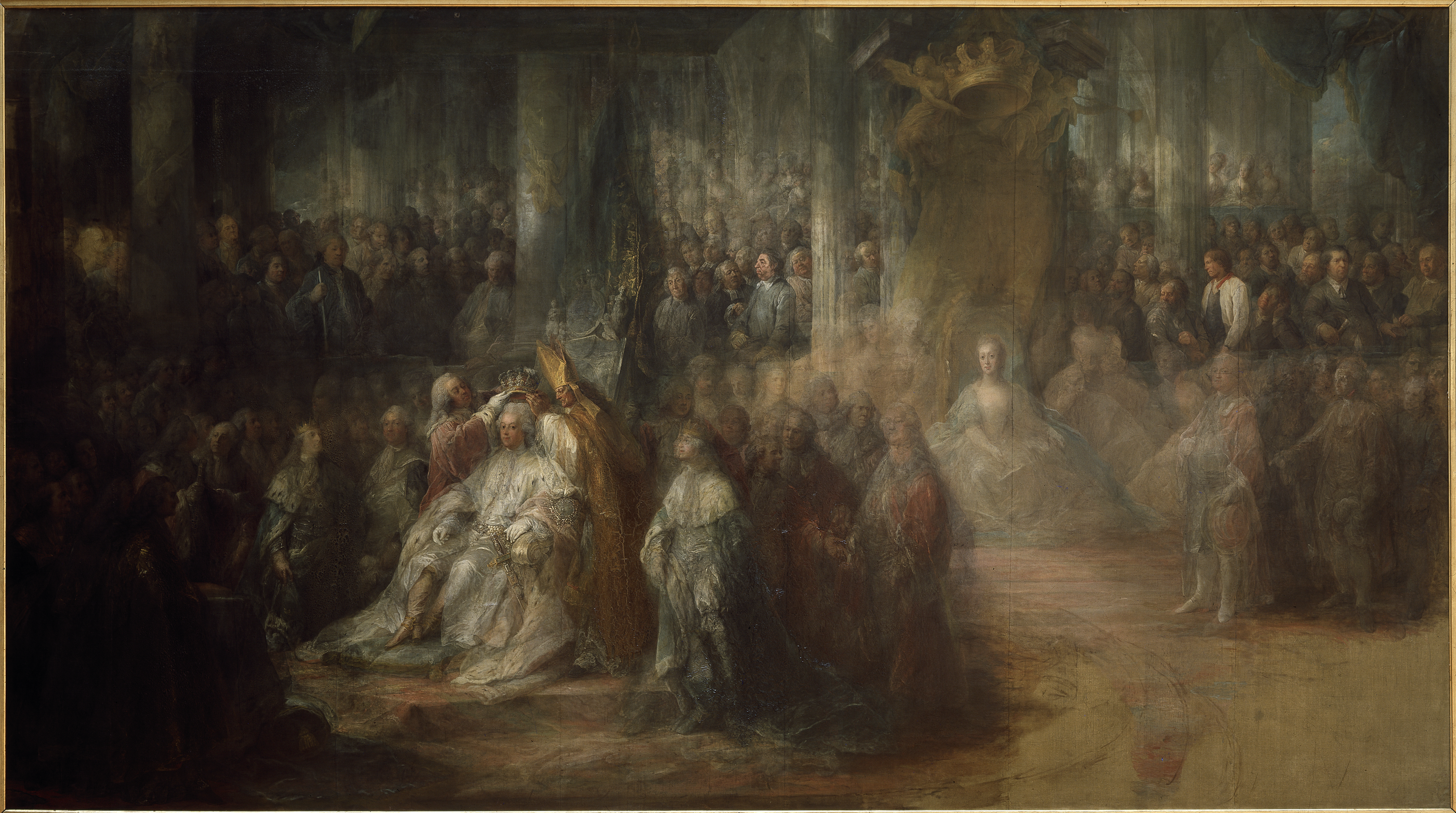
The coronation of King Gustav III in Storkyrkan in 1772, painting by Carl Gustaf Pilo

For some time it was then considered inauspicious for ruling monarchs to be crowned in Storkyrkan. However, the wedding between King Eric XIV of Sweden and Karin Månsdotter, as well as her coronation following the wedding, took place in Storkyrkan in 1568. Maria Eleonora of Brandenburg was also crowned as Queen of Sweden in Storkyrkan, following her marriage to King Gustavus Adolphus in 1620. The next ruling monarch to be crowned in Storkyrkan was, after a hiatus of 130 years, Queen Christina, in 1650. The coronation of the next two kings were in Uppsala, but King Charles XII again preferred Storkyrkan for his coronation in 1697. The coronation of King Frederick I was also conducted in Storkyrkan, in 1720. From then on the coronations of all Swedish monarchs, with the exception of Gustav IV Adolf, took place in Storkyrkan. The last coronation of a Swedish monarch was that of King Oscar II in 1873, which took place in Storkyrkan.

The church has been used for royal weddings on several occasions. Two of the daughters of King Gustav Vasa were married in Storkyrkan, as well as the son of King John III. The wedding between the future King Oscar I and Josephine of Leuchtenberg took place in Storkyrkan in 1823, and several other members of the royal family were married in the church during the 19th and 20th centuries. In 2010, Storkyrkan was the venue for the wedding of Victoria, Crown Princess of Sweden, and Daniel Westling.

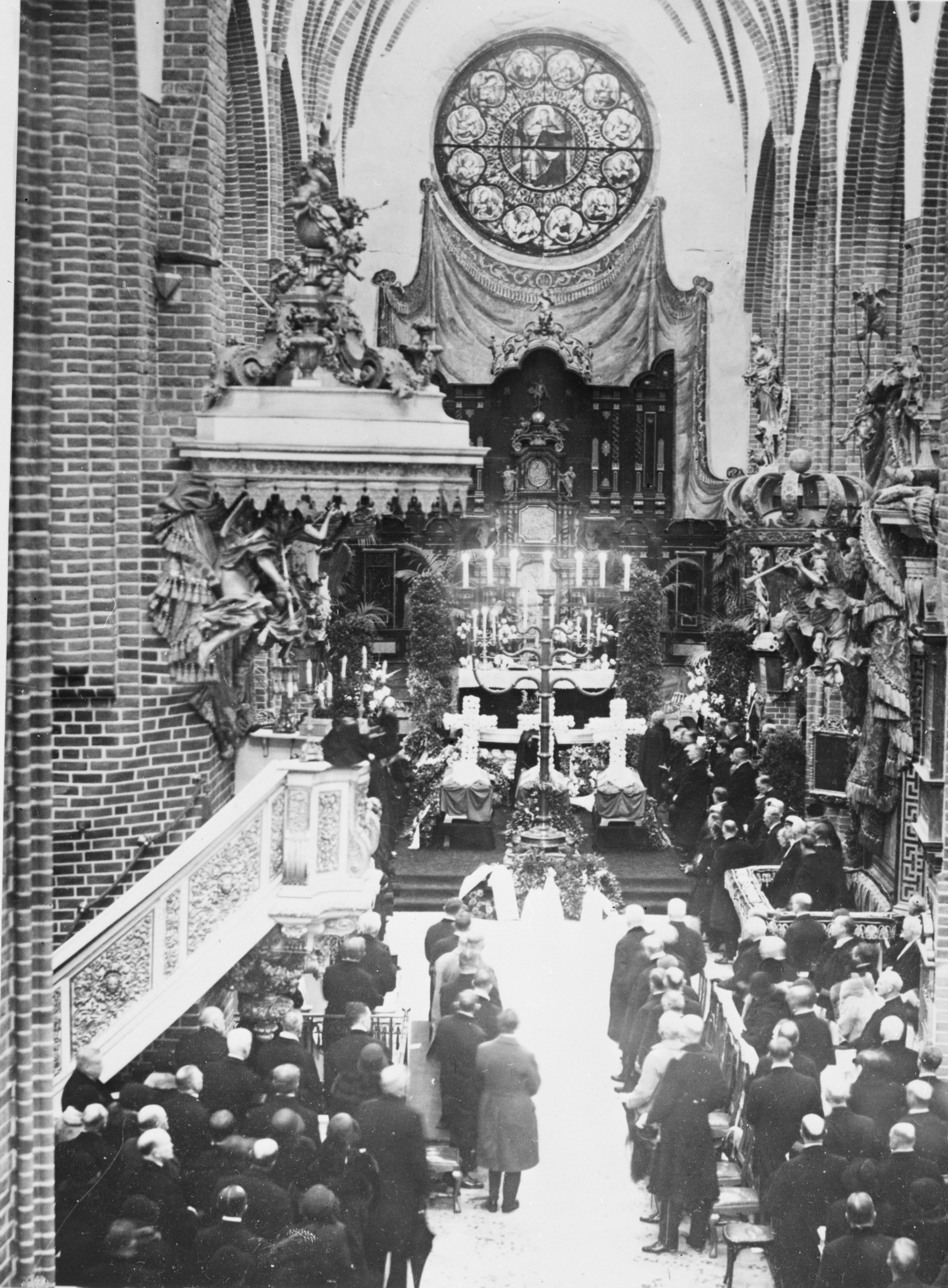
Burial of the members of Andrée's Arctic balloon expedition in Storkyrkan (1930)

While Storkyrkan has rarely been used as a burial church for royalty (instead, Riddarholmen Church fulfilled that role until 1950), a number of high-profile funerals have taken place in Storkyrkan during the 20th century. After the bodies of the three members of the failed Andrée's Arctic balloon expedition (Salomon August Andrée, Knut Frænkel and Nils Strindberg) were retrieved and returned to Stockholm in 1930, their funeral was held in Storkyrkan. More recently, the funerals of writer Astrid Lindgren (died 2002) and of the permanent secretary of the Swedish Academy Sara Danius (died 2019) were also held in Storkyrkan. When MS Estonia sank in 1994 with the loss of many Swedish lives, a memorial service, attended by the royal family and the Prime Minister of Sweden, was held in Storkyrkan. Similarly, the church hosted an extra service after the assassination of foreign minister Anna Lindh in 2003.

Storkyrkan has also been used for other public events. Several military victories were publicly celebrated in the church during the time of the Swedish Empire. The most elaborate of these was probably the celebration of the victory at the Battle of Narva (1700). The victories at Pułtusk (1703), Thorn (1703) and Svensksund (1790) were also publicly celebrated in the church. During the time of the Riksdag of the Estates, the estate of the clergy usually held their meetings in Storkyrkan. Still today, a sermon in Storkyrkan traditionally marks the opening of the Riksdag every autumn. During the Middle Ages the church was also used for meetings of the city council of Stockholm.

== Architecture ==
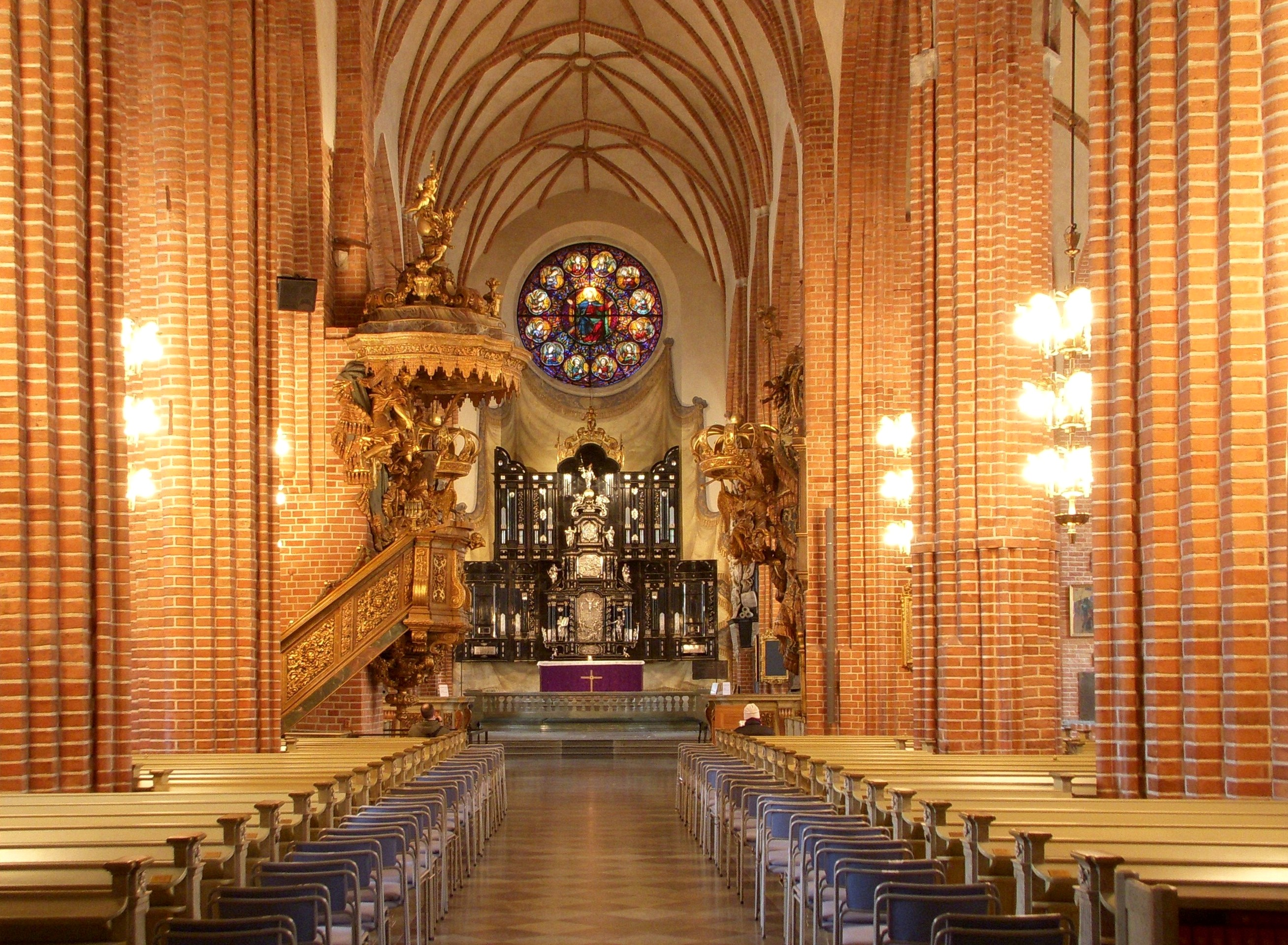
View of the nave from the entrance towards east

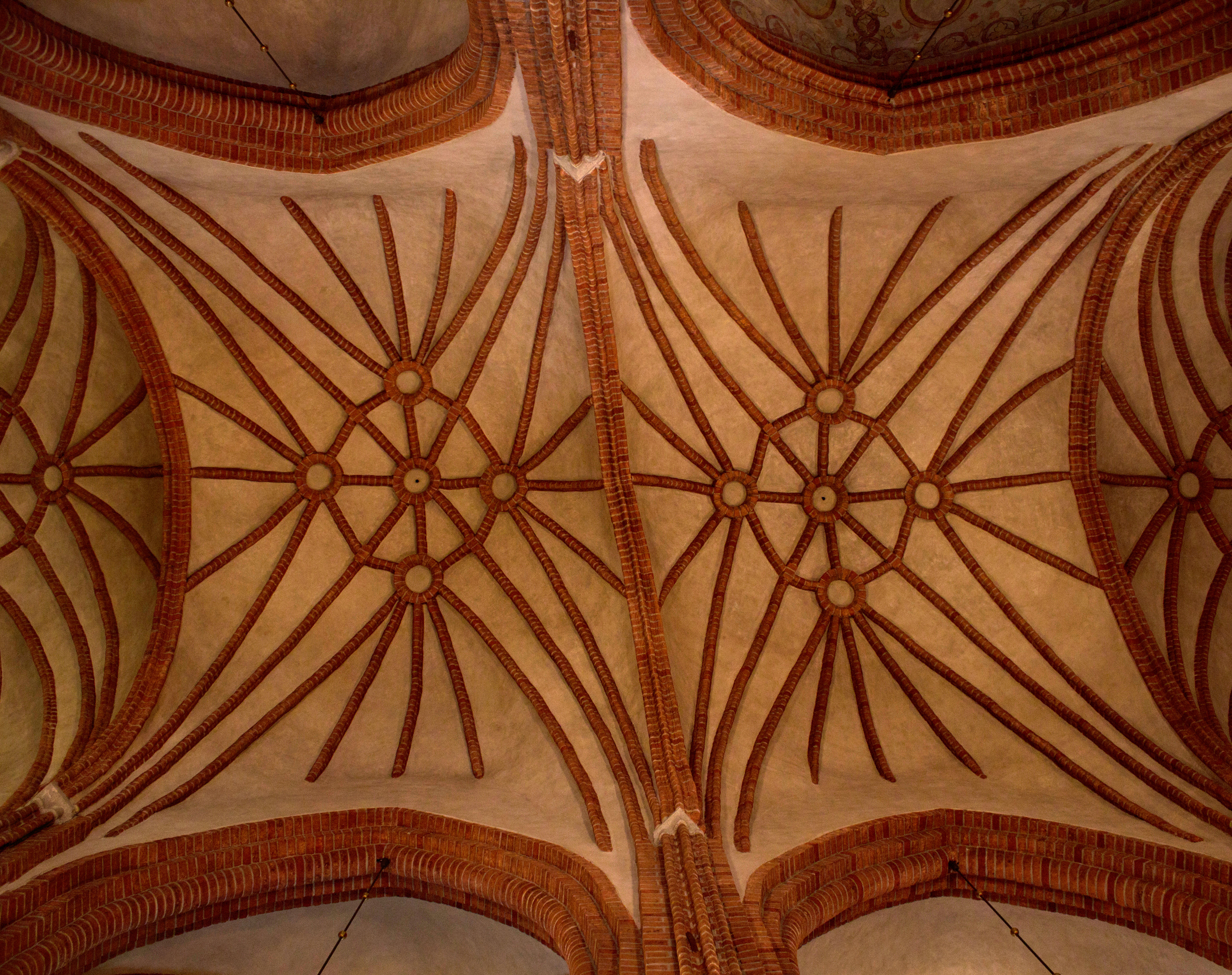
Rib vaults in two of the central bays

=== Exterior ===
The building material of the church is brick. The base of the church is strengthened with sandstone and granite. Storkyrkan is "of modest proportions"; it is 63 metres (207 ft) long and 37.2 metres (122 ft) wide. The exterior of the church is uniformly Baroque, and only the stairwell added by Palmstedt is in a slightly different style. The north and south facades are divided by buttresses treated as pilasters. Otherwise, the elements of the exterior are oriented horizontally rather than vertically. The tower and the gables of the church are decorated with pilasters and mouldings, in a simplified version of Carlberg's original proposal. At the south east corner of the church, a sundial from the 16th century is attached to the wall. A large memorial plaque with an inscription in Latin is placed in the middle of the east wall of the church, commemorating the rebuilding of the church in the 18th century. 28 windows supply the interior with light. The main entrance is in the base of the tower at the west end of the church. Another entrance is located in the north wall, and there are two lesser entrances to the south.

=== Interior ===
Storkyrkan is a hall church, five bays wide and eight bays long. The plan is that of an irregular rectangle, as the form of the building had to be adapted to pre-existing adjacent streets. Brick vaults supported by pillars and richly articulated compound piers cover the entire interior. The eight central bays are covered with rib vaults of a complex and unusual design. The rest of the church has groin vaults. The interior space is divided by the central nave, with open benches on either side. The choir floor is three steps higher than the rest of the church and limited by wrought iron fences to the north and south. Three galleries are placed in the west of the interior, one of which contains the church organ. Most of the windows are clear, but the north westernmost window is decorated with stained glass made by Einar Forseth in the 20th century. The stained glass rose window in the east wall was donated to the church in 1858. It was made in France.

== Furnishings ==
=== Altarpiece ===
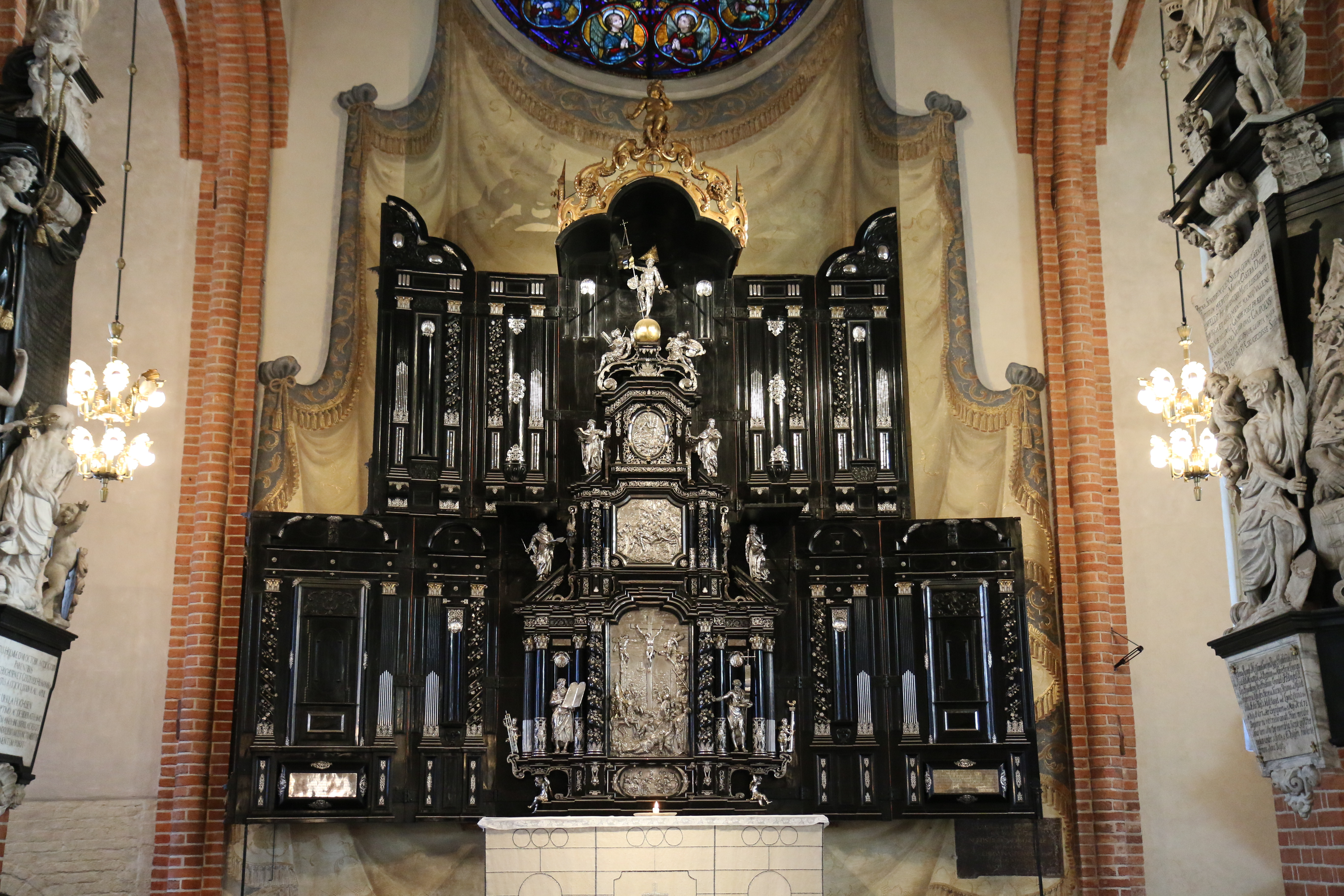
The silver altarpiece

The main altarpiece of Storkyrkan is the so-called silver altarpiece (Swedish: silveraltaret). It was donated by Margareta Pedersdotter, widow of Johan Adler Salvius, in 1652. The altarpiece consists of a central part and two wings; the wings were made somewhat later than the middle section. The Baroque altarpiece was made in the workshop of Eustachius Erdmüller in Hamburg. It is made of ebony and silver. The central part is divided into three levels above a predella and surmounted by a statuette of the resurrected Christ. Each of the levels contains a panel with a silver relief. The reliefs depict, from bottom to top, the Crucifixion, the Entombment and Christ in realm of the dead. The relief on the predella depicts the Last Supper. The relief depicting the Crucifixion is the largest, and its composition may have been inspired by the painting Christ on the Cross by Peter Paul Rubens from 1620. Free-standing silver statuettes flank the central panels. Moses and John the Baptist flank the Crucifixion panel. The second and third panel are flanked by the Four Evangelists.

During the Middle Ages, the church possessed several additional altarpieces. Some of these have been preserved in other locations. The altarpiece currently in Boglösa Church in Uppland was made for Storkyrkan in the 15th century but sold sometime between 1478 and 1481. The altarpiece currently in Jäder Church in Södermanland originally also belonged to Storkyrkan. A third altarpiece, made in Lübeck in 1468, probably by Hermen Rode, is preserved in the Swedish History Museum. Another altarpiece was donated to Storkyrkan in 1629 by Carl Gyllenhielm, who had taken it as loot from Braniewo in present-day Poland. After the silver altarpiece was installed, Gyllenhielm's altarpiece became redundant and was eventually given away. Only the central part of it still exists, and is today located in Kläckeberga Church in Småland.

=== Saint George and the Dragon ===
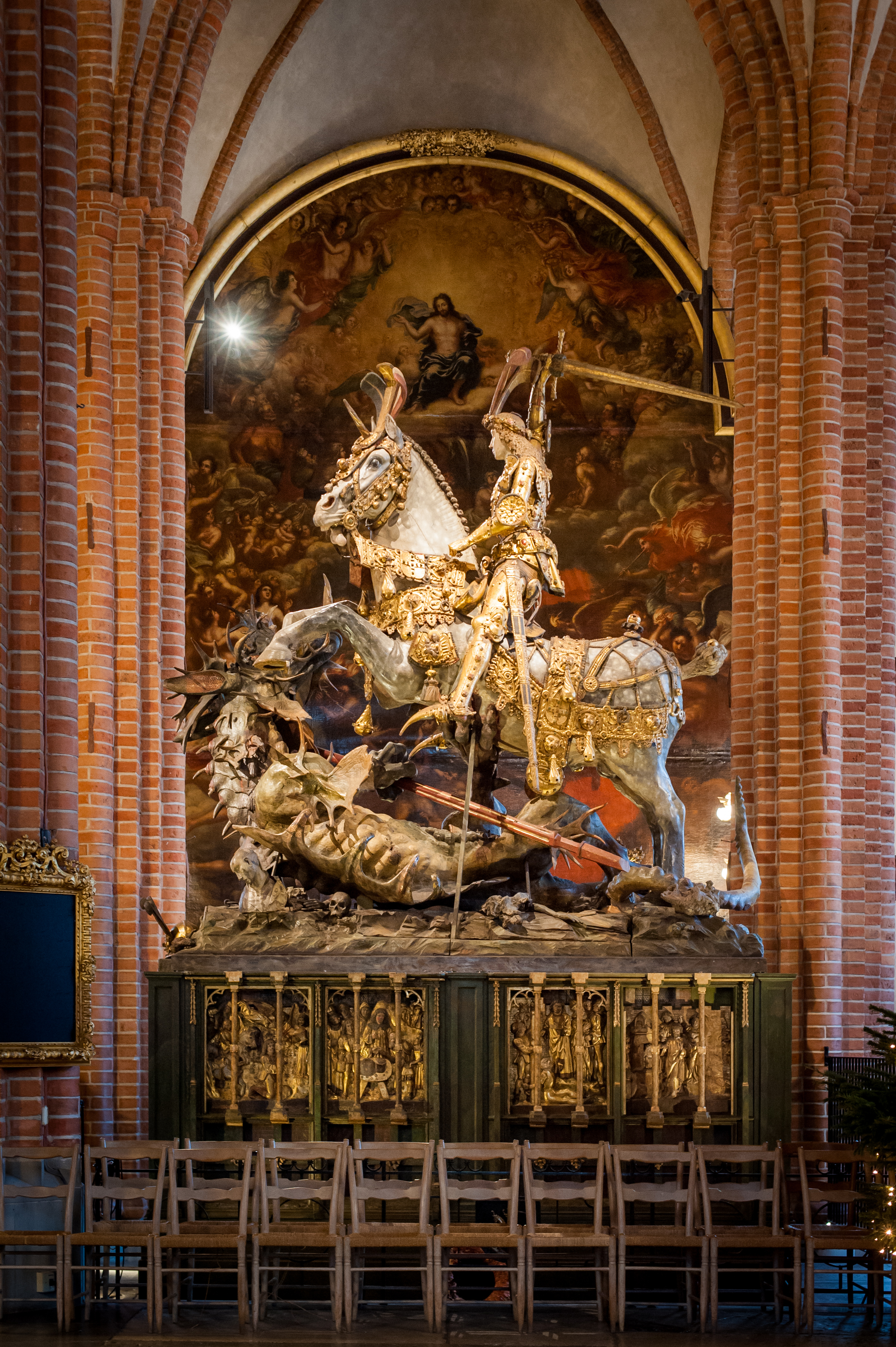
Saint George and the Dragon

North of the choir stands a large, late medieval equestrian statue depicting the legend of Saint George and the Dragon. It has been described as "the most impressive medieval piece of art" as well as "the most curious memorial" in Storkyrkan. The statue is around 3.5 metres (11 ft) tall and depicts the saint on horseback, fighting the dragon. A subsidiary group shows the princess that the saint is rescuing from the dragon, accompanied by the symbolic Lamb of God. The plinth is furthermore decorated with scenes from the legend of Saint George.

It was commissioned by regent Sten Sture the Elder as a funerary monument for him and his wife, after his victory over Danish troops at the Battle of Brunkeberg in 1471. Sten Sture had prayed to the saint to protect the army during the battle. The sculpture was inaugurated in 1489. Saint George and the Dragon does not carry any signature, but is widely attributed to Bernt Notke, both on stylistic grounds and by deduction from archival sources. The sculpture has been interpreted, and was probably intended, as not only a religious work of art, but also as a political as well as a personal monument to Sten Sture and his victory over the Danish army.

=== Other medieval furnishings ===
The church is also in possession of a crucifix, possibly also made by Notke or an artist working in the same tradition. The crucifix is made of oak and has lost its earlier polychromy. It was probably made some time between 1475 and 1500. A rood cross made c. 1400 previously belonged to Storkyrkan but is today on display at the Museum of Medieval Stockholm.

The baptismal font of the church was made in 1514, according to an inscription on its side. It belongs to a group of baptismal fonts, similar in style, found in central and northern Sweden. It is made of limestone from Uppland.

A 370 centimetres (150 in) tall seven-branched bronze candelabrum, probably made at the end of the 15th century, belongs to the church. It is decorated with sculptures of lions at its foot, and with two human faces on the shaft. Such candelabra are unusual in Sweden (another example exists in Lund Cathedral) but more common in Germany, where it was probably made.

In 1564, the helmet and spurs of Saint Olaf, the oldest preserved war trophies taken by Swedish troops, were put on display in Storkyrkan. In the 1860s they were moved to the Swedish History Museum.

=== Vädersolstavlan ===
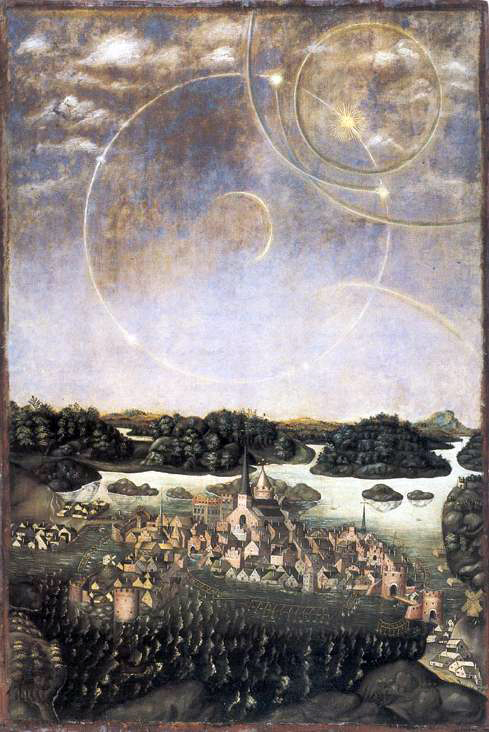
Vädersolstavlan

The oldest known depiction of Stockholm in colour is the so-called Vädersolstavlan (The sun dog painting), which was donated to the church in 1535 by Olaus Magnus. It was painted by Urban målare. The currently visible painting is however a copy from 1636, made by Jacob Heinrich Elbfas; judging from building details in the painting, it appears to be a faithful reproduction. The painting depicts Stockholm as it appeared in the early 16th century, and above it a sun dog, an atmospheric optical phenomenon, observed over Stockholm on 20 April 1535. The painting was restored in 1998–99.

=== Other paintings ===
Storkyrkan houses two monumental paintings by David Klöcker Ehrenstrahl, The Crucifixion and The Last Judgment, painted in 1695 and 1696 respectively. They were originally intended to be displayed in the Royal Chapel at Tre Kronor but were saved from the fire which destroyed the castle and instead put on display in Storkyrkan. The Crucifixion is 7.4 metres (24 ft) tall, The Last Judgment more than 10 metres (33 ft).

Among the other paintings in the church, there is an epitaph taken as war loot from Frombork in 1626 and a 17th-century Russian icon of Saint Nicholas probably made in Moscow, which was seized by Swedish troops after a battle in 1703 and donated to the church by General Carl Magnus Stuart.

=== Royal pews and pulpit ===
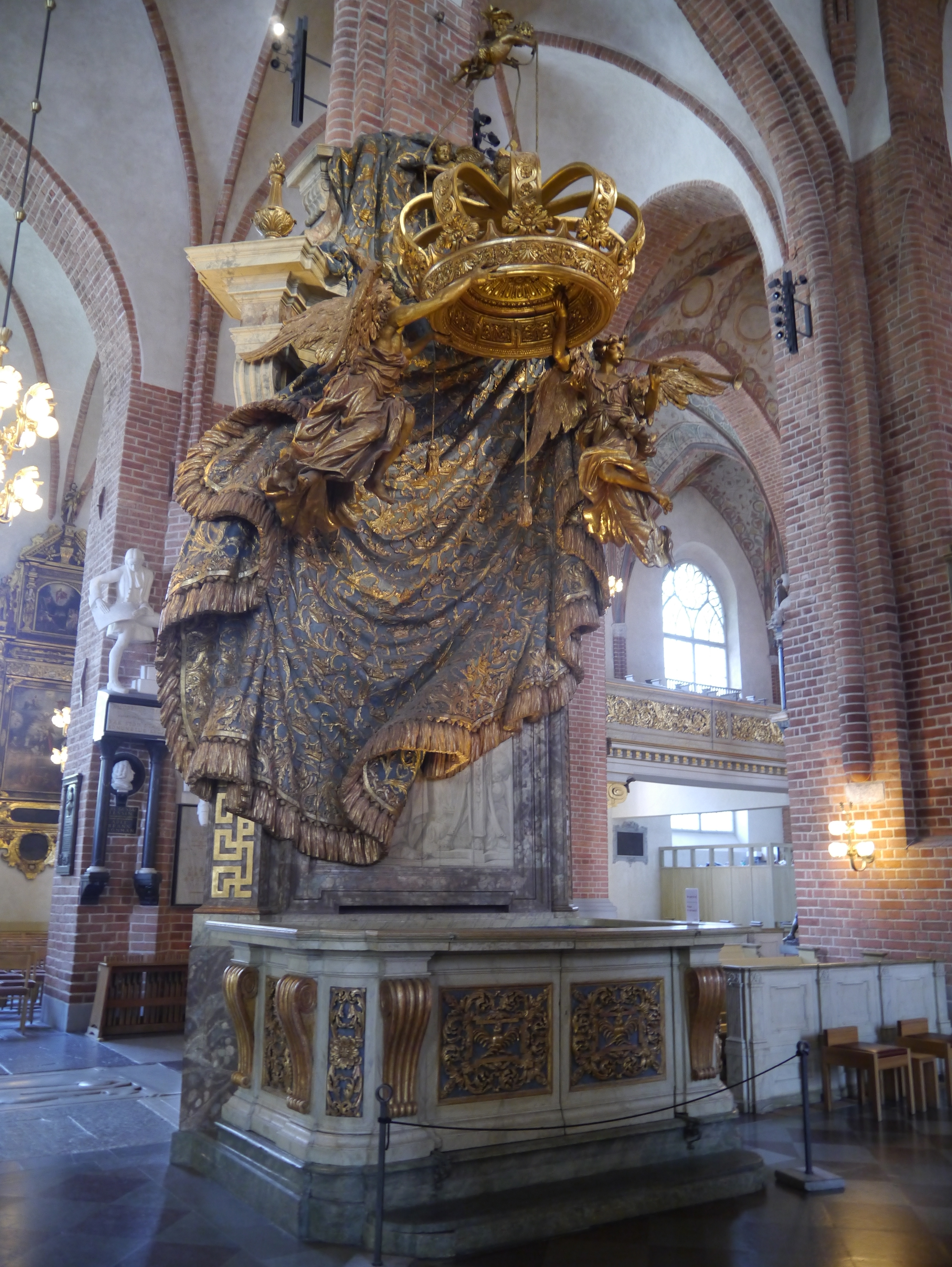
One of the royal pews

The pulpit of the church is attached to one of the pillars on the north side of the nave. It was designed and constructed by Burchard Precht between 1698 and 1702. It is made of gilt wood and decorated with mouldings and reliefs. One bay east of the pulpit are the two royal pews, one attached to the north and the other to the south pillar of the nave. They are made of two parts. The lower is a seating area closed in by a decorated wooden barrier. Originally a throne was placed in each of the pews. The upper part of each pew is a gilt wooden canopy in the form of an oversize royal crown carried by angelic sculptures against a background in the form of an imitated drapery. The royal pews, intended for the royal family, were designed by Nicodemus Tessin the Younger and constructed by Burchard Precht.

=== Graves and funerary monuments ===
Until the practice was abolished during the 19th century, burials within the church were considered prestigious and led to the church being crowded with graves. The church still contains a large number of decorated graves and other funerary monuments. Among these, the graves of the family of Jesper Mattson Cruus af Edeby and the grave of Johan Adler Salvius are among the most elaborate. There is also a profusion of memorial plaques attached to the walls; the one celebrating the memory of Nicodemus Tessin the Elder, Nicodemus Tessin the Younger and Carl Gustav Tessin is one of the more recent, made by sculptor Carl Milles.

=== Votive ship ===
One of the oldest votive ships in the world comes from Storkyrkan. It dates from the 17th century and is today kept in the Maritime Museum in Stockholm. A copy hangs in the church.

== Music ==
The organ of Storkyrkan dates from 1960, and was made by Marcussen & Søn in Denmark. The facade of the organ was designed in 1789 and is three bays wide.

The church has been used as a concert venue since the end of the 18th century. Today the church has four choirs. One of these, Storkyrkans Gosskör (Storkyrkan's Boys Choir) traces its roots to the 17th century. At least three organists of Storkyrkan were also composers; Andreas Düben (c. 1597/98–1662), Ferdinand Zellbell the Younger (1719–1780) and Harald Fryklöf (1882–1918).

== See also ==
- List of churches in Stockholm

== Works cited ==
- Hultin, Olof; Johansson, Bengt OH; Mårtelius, Johan; Waern, Rasmus (2009). The complete guide to architecture in Stockholm. Stockholm: Arkitektur förlag AB. ISBN 978-91-86050-75-7.
- Jermsten, Elisabet (2008). Storkyrkan (PDF) (in Swedish). Stockholms stift (Diocese of Stockholm).
- Regner, Elisabet (2013). Det medeltida Stockholm. En arkeologisk guidebok [Medieval Stockholm. An archaeological guide book] (in Swedish). Lund: Historiska Media. ISBN 978-91-86297-88-6.
- Roosval, Johnny (1927). S. Nikolai eller Storkyrkan. II, Byggnadshistoria [St. Nicholas or The Great Church. II, History of the building] (PDF). Sveriges kyrkor, konsthistoriskt inventarium (in Swedish). Vol. 24. Stockholm: Centraltryckeriet. ISSN 0284-1894.
- Roosval, Johnny; Upmark, Gustaf; Branting, Agnes, eds. (1927). S. Nikolai eller Storkyrkan. III, Inredning och lösa inventarier [St. Nicholas or The Great Church. III, Furnishings and loose items] (PDF). Sveriges kyrkor, konsthistoriskt inventarium (in Swedish). Vol. 24. Stockholm: Centraltryckeriet. ISSN 0284-1894.
- Simonsson, Ivar (1924). "Storkyrkoförsamlingens historia. En översikt" [The history of the congregation of Storkyrkan. An overview]. In Roosval, Johnny (ed.). S. Nikolai eller Storkyrkan. I, Församlingshistoria [St. Nicholas or The Great Church. I, History of the congregation] (PDF). Sveriges kyrkor, konsthistoriskt inventarium (in Swedish). Vol. 24. Stockholm: Centraltryckeriet. ISSN 0284-1894.
- Svanberg, Jan; Qwarnström, Anders (1993). Sankt Göran och draken [Saint George and the Dragon] (in Swedish). Stockholm: Tidens förlag. ISBN 91-550-3914-6.
- Ullén, Marian (1996). "Gotikens kyrkobyggande" [Church building during the Gothic era]. In Augustsson, Jan-Erik (ed.). Signums svenska konsthistoria. Den gotiska konsten [Signum's history of Swedish art. Gothic art] (in Swedish). Lund: Signum. pp. 37–134. ISBN 91-87896-23-0.
