= Finska kyrkogränd =

Alley in Gamla stan, Stockholm, Sweden

Coordinates: 59°19′32.3″N 18°04′21.3″E

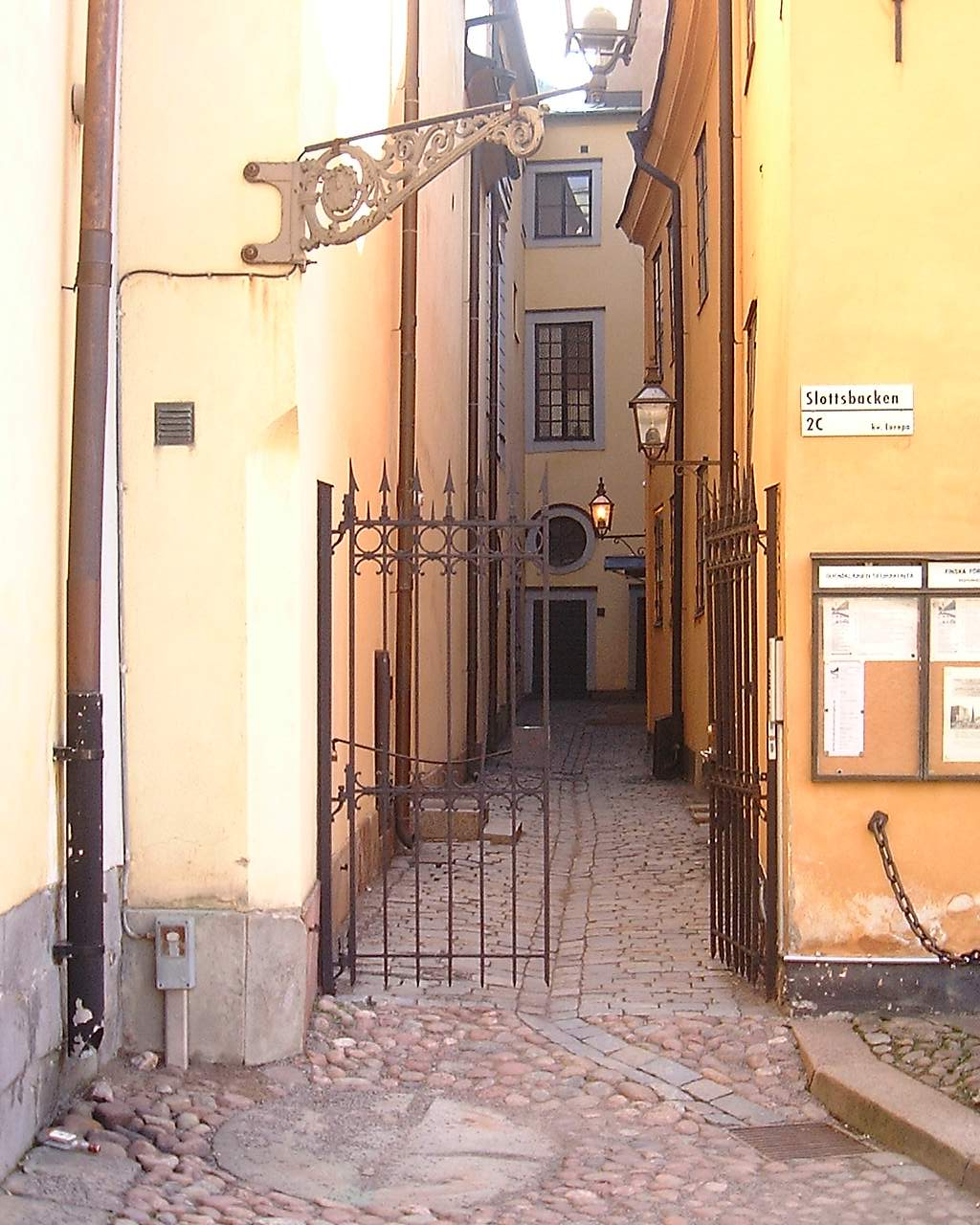
Finska kyrkogränd.

Finska kyrkogränd (Swedish: "Finnish Church Alley") is a blind alley in Gamla stan, an old town in central Stockholm, Sweden. Leading south from Slottsbacken, the alley separates the Finnish Church from the Tessin Palace. It was also named after the vicinity to the former. It forms a parallel street to Bollhusgränd and Källargränd.

The alley, for long the property of the Crown, used to lead to Trädgårdsgatan. It was excepted from a land donation in 1648 for the construction of the Lilla Bollhuset ("Small Ball House"), a building originally intended for ball games but mostly used for theatre. This latter building was rebuilt into the Finnish Church in 1725, and as the Finnish parish later enlarged the building, the alley became a blind alley periodically completely sealed off.

== See also ==
- List of streets and squares in Gamla stan
- Bollhustäppan
