= Finnish church =

Finnish church may refer to:

- Evangelical Lutheran Church of Finland, one of two national churches of Finland
- Orthodox Church of Finland, one of two national churches of Finland
- Finnish Church, Stockholm, a church building in Stockholm, Sweden
