= Jeanne Perrette Le Chevalier =

Jeanne Perrette Le Chevalier (1688–1774) was a French stage actress, active in Sweden. She was married to the actor and theater manager Charles Langlois.

Jeanne Perrette Le Chevalier and her husband and son Alexandre came to Sweden as members of the French theatre and opera company Académie royale de musique, which was engaged by Jean-Baptiste Landé to perform at the royal court and at the Bollhuset in Stockholm in 1723–1727. She was a leading member of the theatre and her specialty was queen- and character roles. In 1726, she was noted for her performance as Premiére Bergére in a libretto created by her husband and performed in honour of the birthday of Queen Ulrika Eleonora of Sweden. The Langlois family chose to remain in Sweden when the French theatre was dissolved. In 1729, she was engaged as an agent to recruit a new French theatre company to perform in Sweden, and she accompanied Carl Gustaf Tessin and Ulla Tessin to France. However, in the end, nothing came of the project.

In 1730, her husband acquired a permit from the guilds to trade in smaller luxury articles to support the family. He applied for it because she was a married woman and therefore legally a minor, but in practice, his wife used the permit and supported the family with the luxury trade for several years, becoming a successful businesswoman. She occasionally continued to perform on stage when French-language plays were performed in Bollhuset theatre, such as in La Médée et Jason in 1740 and La scene de reconnaissance in 1748. In 1752, it is noted the Langlois couple gave French lessons; her husband was the instructor of the pages of the royal court, while she hosted a Pension school for daughters of the nobility.
