= Charles Langlois =

Charles Langlois may refer to:

- Charles Langlois (actor) (1692–1762), French actor
- Charles Langlois (politician) (born 1938), Canadian politician
- Charlie Langlois (1894–1965), Canadian ice hockey player
