= Järnpojke =

Small sculpture in Stockholm, Sweden

Coordinates: 59°19′32″N 18°04′20″E

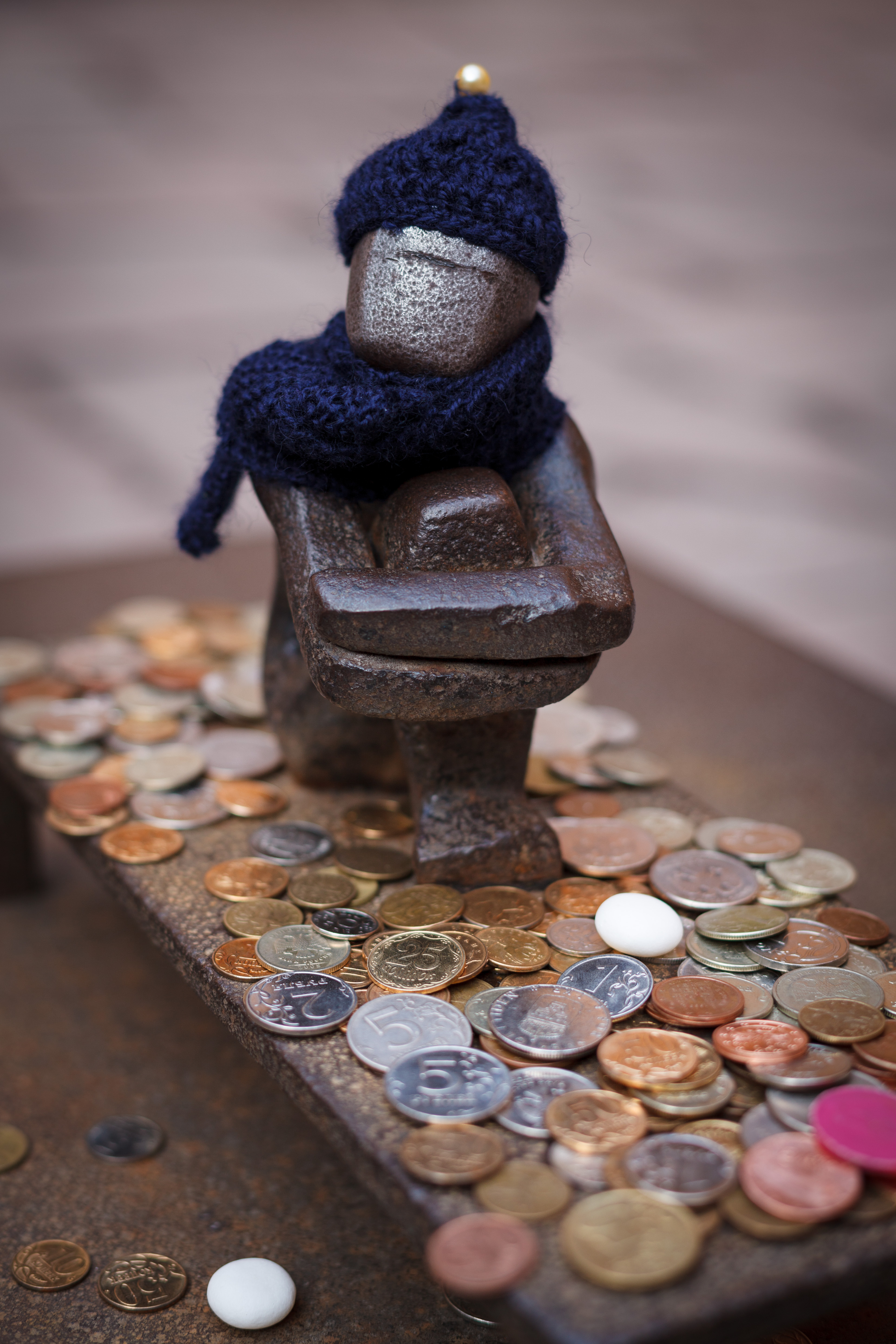
Järnpojke, Little boy looking at the moon, the smallest statue in Stockholm.

Järnpojke or Iron Boy (in English known as the "little boy who looks at the Moon") is a sculpture in Gamla stan (Old Town) of Stockholm, Sweden by Liss Eriksson, which is only 15 centimetres (5.9 in) high and therefore is the smallest public monument of Stockholm.

The sculpture was created in 1954 by the Swedish artist Liss Eriksson, but was inaugurated at this point only in 1967. The sculpture is located behind the Finnish Church, which is only a few meters away from the Stockholm Palace, however hard to find due to its secluded location.

In winter, the little boy is also to be found wearing a winter hat and scarf.
