= Iron boy =

Iron boy may refer to:

- Iván Calderón (boxer), born 1975, Puerto Rican boxer
- Järnpojke, a statue in Old Town, Stockholm, Sweden
- Iron Boy (album), an album by Black Sherif
- Iron Boy (film), 2026 French animated film
