= Charles Langlois (actor) =

French actor (1692–1762)

- Born: Charles Langlois; 1692; Paris, France
- Died: 1762 (aged c. 70); Sweden
- Spouse: Jeanne Perrette Le Chevalier

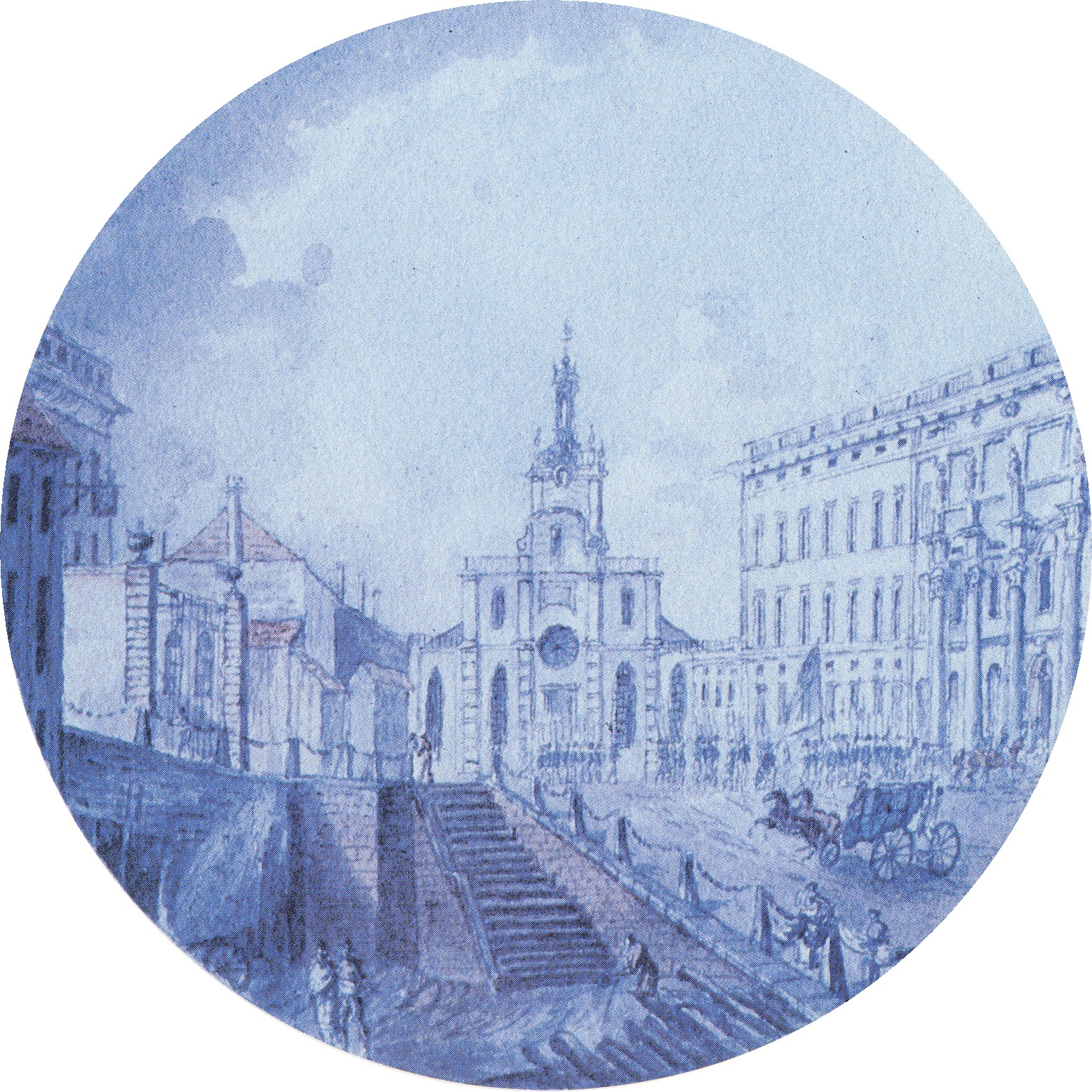
Bollhuset at Slottsbacken in Stockholm during the 1780s. From right to left: Stockholm Palace, Storkyrkan, Bollhuset Theatre and the Tessin Palace. Drawing, Martin Rudolf Heland.

Charles Langlois (French pronunciation: [ʃaʁl lɑ̃ɡlwa]; 1692–1762) was a French actor who spent a large part of his career in Sweden, where he was to play an important part in Swedish theatre history as the originator of the first national theatre in Sweden, and its first director. He was also a composer.

== Life and career ==
Charles Langlois was born in Paris and became an actor early in life with a travelling theatre troupe who toured the French countryside. He married his colleague, Jeanne Perrette le Chevalier, with whom he had a son, Alexandre, in 1718.

=== Moving to Sweden ===
In 1723, Langlois and his family arrived in Sweden as members of the troupe, which was hired to perform at the theatre of Bollhuset in Stockholm under the leadership of Jean-Baptiste Landé. His speciality was playing kings and peasants within French theatre, and Scaramouche on the Italian stage, while his wife took the parts of queens and other characters. He wrote a libretto to celebrate the birthday of the Swedish queen in 1724, and performed in two such libretti for the queen as Pan, with his wife playing Première Bergère in 1726 and 1727. In 1727, he became involved in a conflict with Landé when he launched performances on Bollhuset without Landés approval.

When the French troupe left Sweden in 1727, the Langlois family stayed. In 1730, he was given permission to trade in luxury goods, although this would actually be run by his wife, who was quite successful as a businesswoman. Langlois himself was a French language teacher. Both he and his wife were engaged on different occasions as agents to hire a new troupe from France, Germany or the Netherlands, and in 1731, a German troupe was hired instead, though it is not confirmed if this should be contributed to their efforts.

=== The first national theatre in Sweden ===
When the first Swedish national theatre was founded in Bollhuset in 1737, there was a need for an experienced professional to organise the whole affair, and Langlois was hired as their director, a job for which he had great enthusiasm. The theatre was temporarily closed in the 1738–39 season, and Langlois became one of the most eager participants in the task of persuading the government to open it again. When it did, in 1739, he was replaced as director, but in 1740, when the government declared the theatre a private venture, the actors themselves formed a board of directors, with Langlois as the chairman. He shared this position with Johan Palmberg and Peter Lindahl as assistant directors, as he himself was considered too emotional to be diplomatic.

He was only used as an actor when the theatre offered performances in the French language, as he did not speak Swedish very well; the Langlois couple played the main parts in La Médée et le Jason in 1740, and in La scene de reconnaissance in 1748. Langlois and his wife were also active as French language teachers; him for the pages of the royal court, his wife for girls from the nobility.

When the Swedish troupe was fired by the royal house after the 1753–54 season and replaced with a new French troupe, Langlois sold his shares in the theatre. He was active in the French Du Londel Troupe, where he played some modest parts, until 1755, when he retired. He believed that the closure of the first national theatre was temporary, and in 1757, he made an attempt to get royal permission to open it again, but he did not succeed.

Langlois was not the only French immigrant of the 1720s who was to contribute to the first national theatre; Jean Delpergat was to be its decorator, Jean Marquard its dancing-master and the dancer Gabriel Senac had been a member of the French troupe of the 1720s, and the last was to be a part of the new French troupe until the 1757–1758 season. The situation was to be the same when the second (and lasting) Swedish opera, theatre and ballet was founded by Gustav III of Sweden, and French tradition was to be very strong in Swedish theatre culture until the 19th century.
