= Aksinya Sergeeva =

Russian ballet dancer (1726–1756)

Aksinya Sergeeva (1726 – 1756), was a Russian ballerina. She belonged to the pioneer group of professional native ballet dancers in Russia. She has been referred to as the first female performer (in Russia) whose career is known.

She was trained by Jean-Baptiste Landé in 1738-39 and belonged to the first group of native dancers trained for the Imperial Russian Ballet upon its foundation in 1738. She participated in several important parts during the 1740s, among them the celebrations around the coronation of empress Elizabeth of Russia. She retired in 1753.
