= Avdotya Timofeyeva =

Russian ballerina

Avdotia Timofeyeva (c. 1739-?), was a Russian ballerina. She belonged to the first group of ballet dancers in the history of Russian ballet. Timofejeva was a part of the first group of ballet students trained by the founder of the Russian ballet, Jean-Baptiste Landé, and was given a position in the ballet of the Imperial theatres in 1748. She performed many parts in the ballets by Giovanni Battista Locatelli and Antonio Sacco.
