= Tessin Palace =

17th-century Stockholm landmark

Coordinates: 59°19′33″N 18°04′23″E

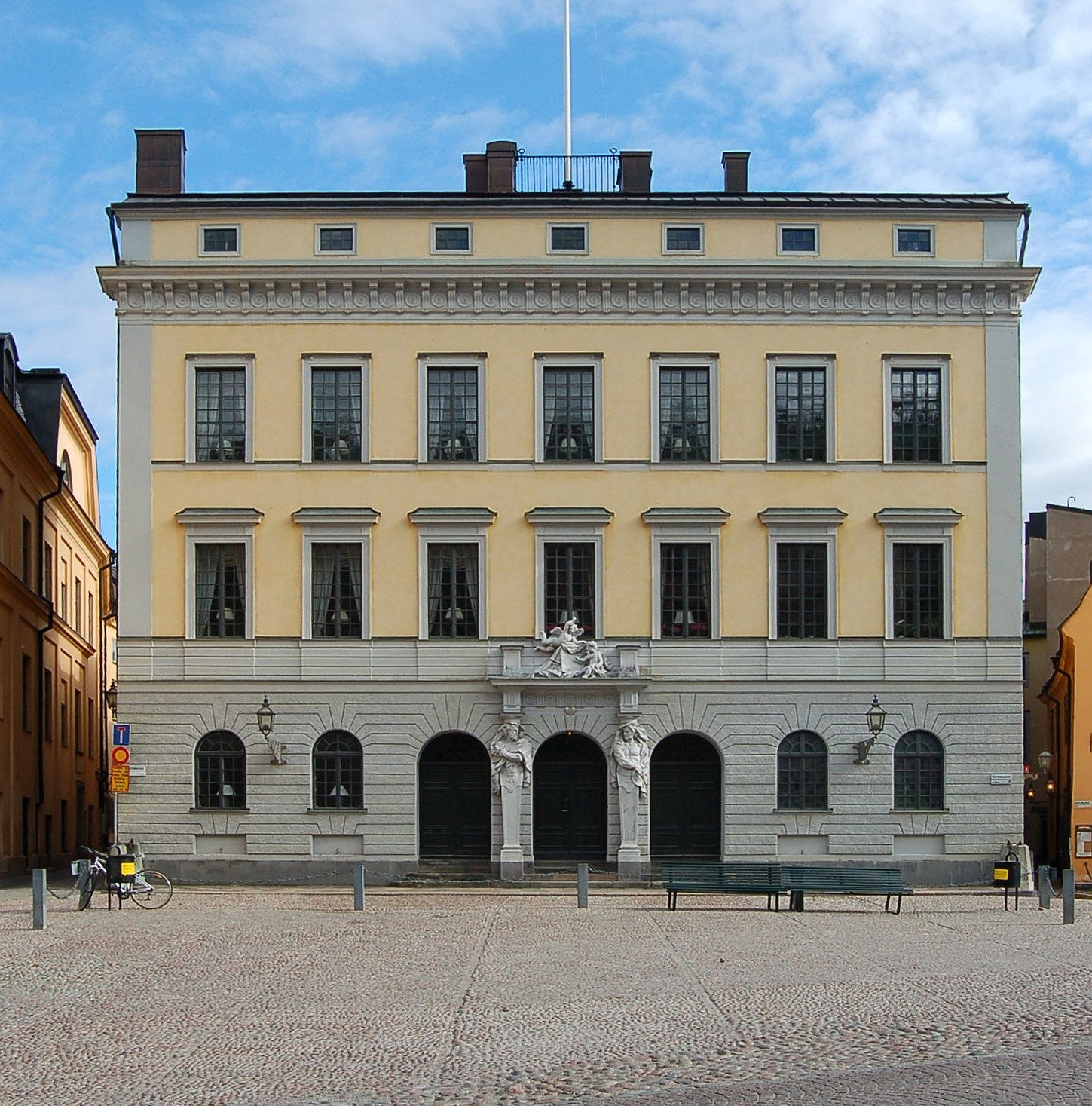
- Tessin Palace
- Interactive map of the Tessin Palace area

General information
- Architectural style: Baroque
- Location: Stockholm, Sweden
- Construction started: 1694
- Completed: 1700

Design and construction
- Architect: Nicodemus Tessin the Younger

The Tessin Palace (Swedish: Tessinska palatset) is a baroque town house located in Gamla stan, the old town in central Stockholm. Located next to the Royal Palace, it is facing Slottsbacken, the major approach to the Stockholm Palace, and flanked by two alleys, Finska kyrkogränd and Bollhusgränd.

The mansion was constructed between 1694 and 1700 by architect Nicodemus Tessin the Younger. The building was inherited by Tessin's son Carl Gustaf Tessin who had to sell it in 1755 for financial reasons. The palace later became property of the crown and has been used as residence for the Governor of Stockholm and later Governor of Stockholm County.

== See also ==
- Architecture of Stockholm
