= Jean-Baptiste Landé =

French ballet dancer (died 1748)

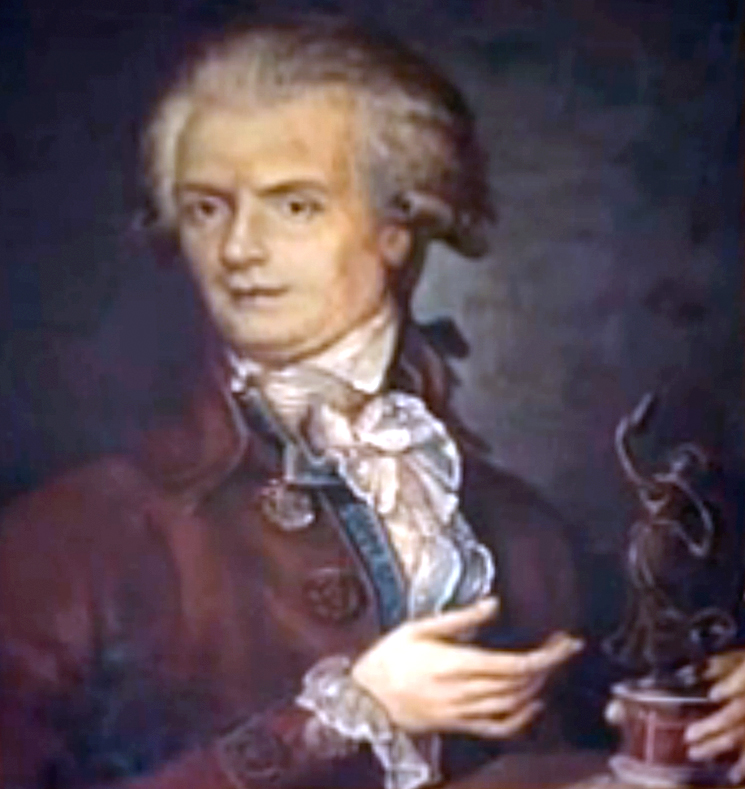
Jean-Baptiste Landé.

Jean-Baptiste Landé (died 26 February 1748) was a French ballet dancer, active in Sweden, Denmark and Russia. He is the founder of the Mariinsky Ballet in Russia.

== Sweden ==
Landé was employed at the Polish royal court in Dresden when he was engaged by King Frederick I of Sweden in 1721. He was appointed dancing master of the Swedish court and in 1723 he became the director of the French Opera-Theatre in Bollhuset in Stockholm, which he named L'Académie royale de musique et de danse. In 1726, he was a guest ballet master at the first theatre in Denmark, the Lille Grönnegade theatre (1722–1728), where he performed with his wife.

== Denmark ==
He left Sweden in 1728, after a conflict with Charles Langlois, who intruded on his theatre privilege by arranging his own plays at Bollhuset. He went to Denmark, where the only previous theatre had been closed in 1728, and tried to start his own theatre, but theatre was banned in Denmark in 1730-1746, and he supported himself as a dance teacher.

== Russia ==
In 1734, he was invited to Russia, where he was made dance master at the military academy. After a ballet performance for Empress Anna in 1735, the Russian Ballet School was established in 1738 with Landé as its ballet master. He educated the first dancers in Russia, which were taken from the staff at the royal palace: Timofei Bublikov, Nikolai Choglokov, Afanasy Toporkov, Ivan Shatilov, Nikolai Tolubeyev, Sergei Chalyshkin, Andrei Samarin and Andrei Nesterov, and among the females Yelizaveta, Avdotia Timofeyeva and Aksinya Sergeeva.

Landé was the dance instructor of Catherine the Great after her arrival in Russia in 1744.

== Other sources ==
- Samuel H. Cross, "The Russian Ballet Before Dyagilev." Slavonic and East European Review. American Series 3.4 (1944): 19-49. in JSTOR
- Gidlunds förlag: Ny svensk teaterhistoria. Teater före 1800 (New Swedish theatre history. Theatre before 1800) (in Swedish)
