= Liss Eriksson =

Swedish sculptor

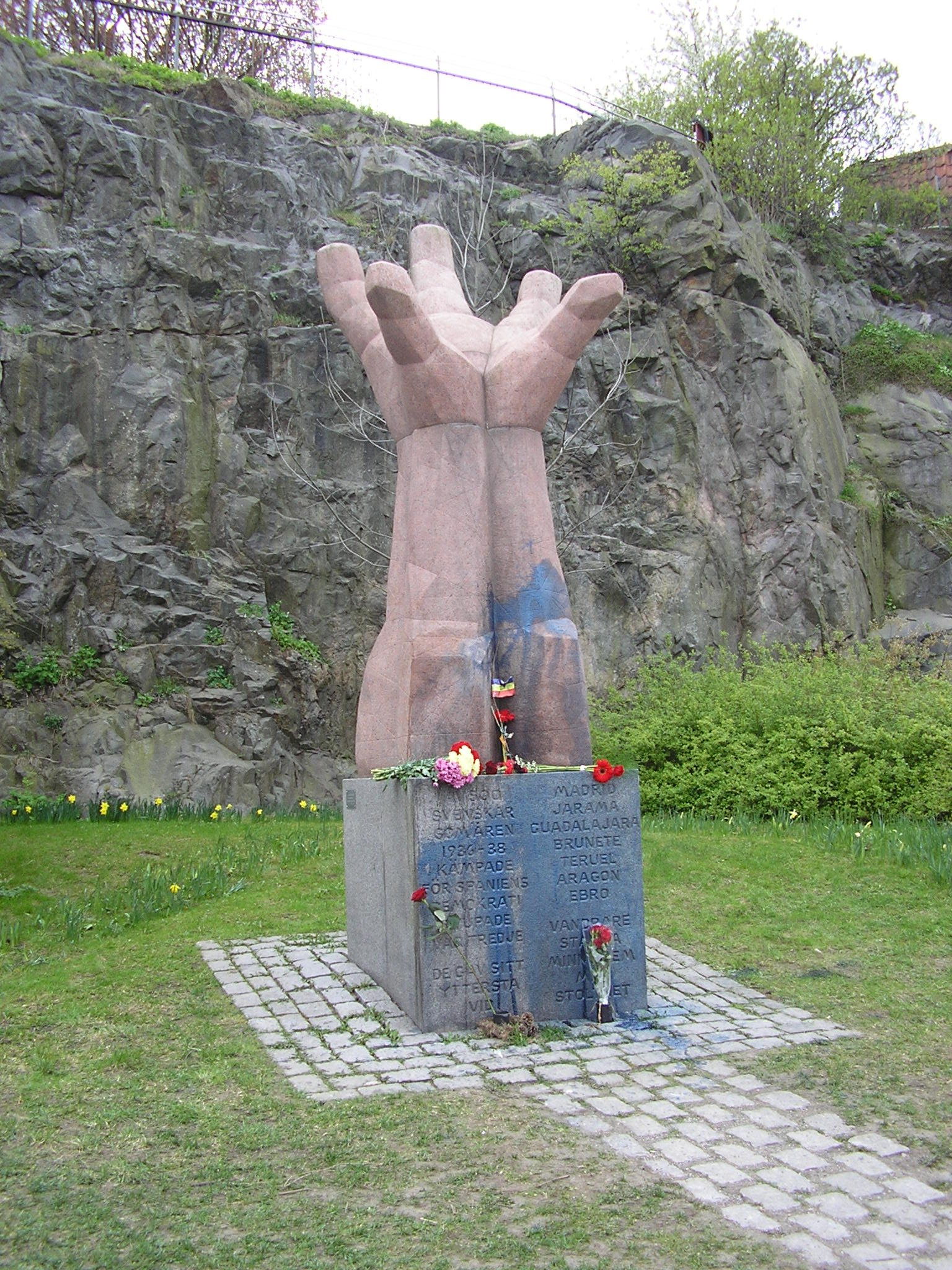
La Mano.

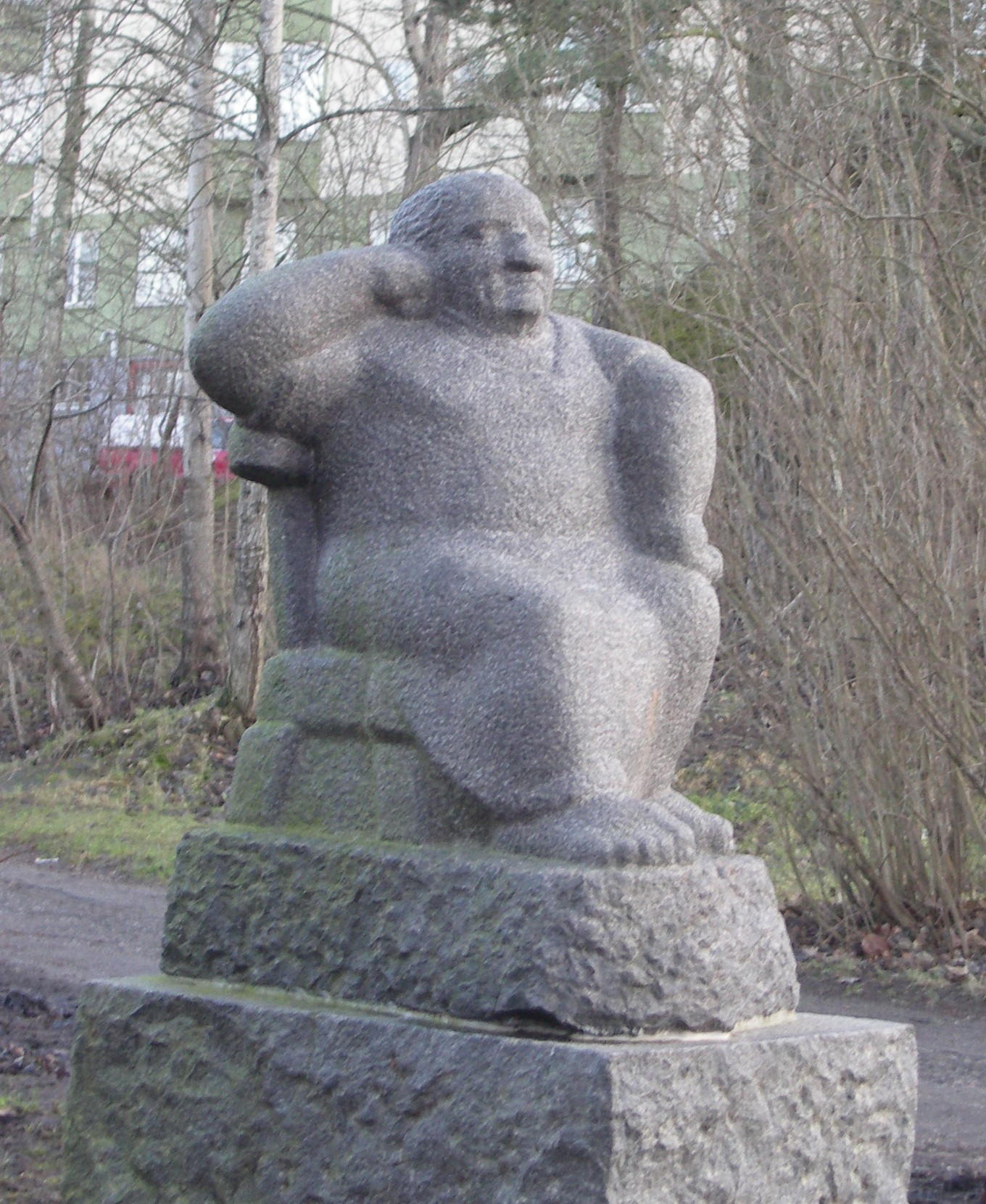
Aunt, granite, Västertorp Sculpture Park, Stockholm. Photo: Bengt Oberger

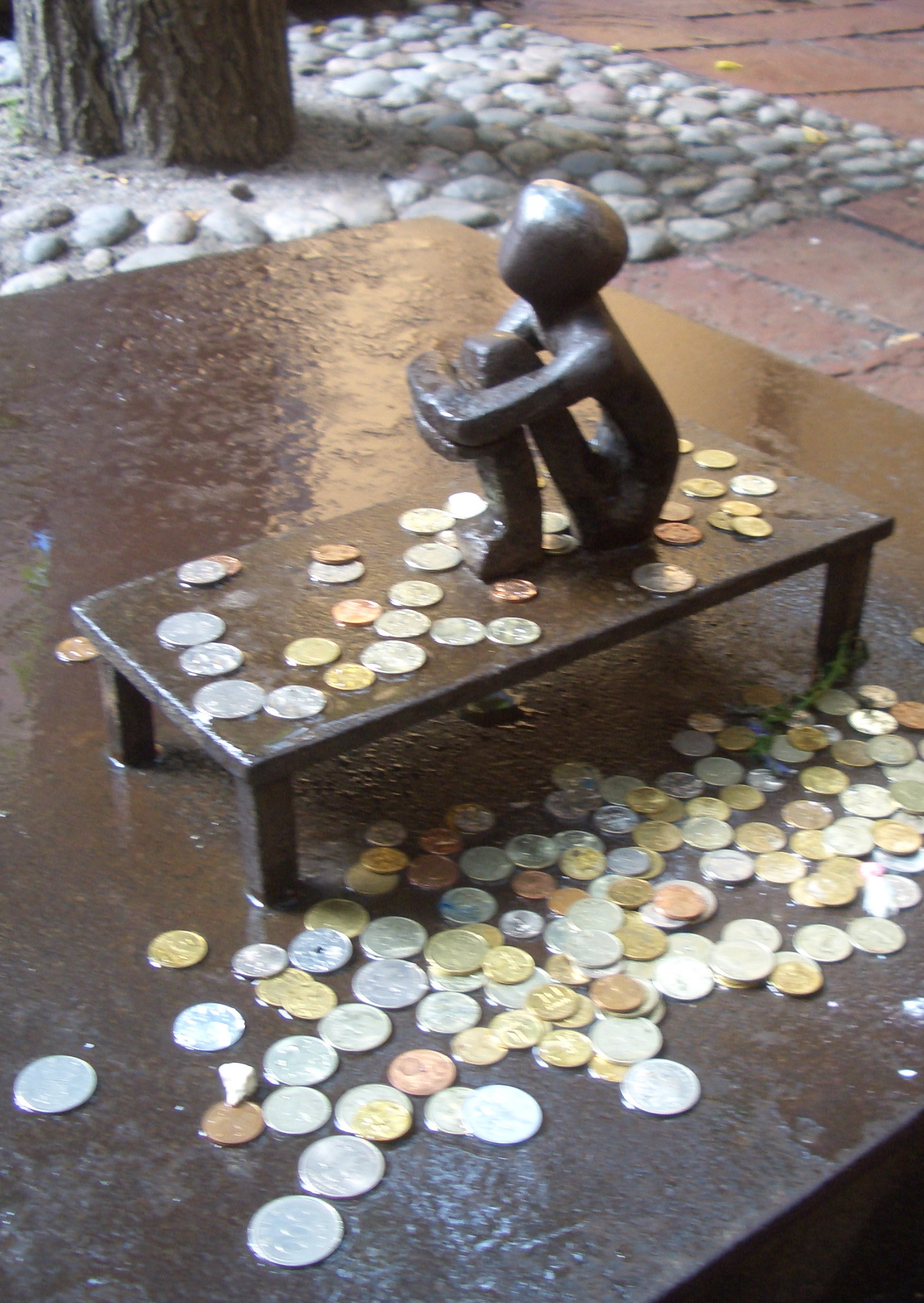
"Boy looking at the moon" at Bollhustäppan in Gamla stan

Liss Eriksson (31 August 1919 – 19 July 2000) was a Swedish sculptor.

== Life ==
The son of the sculptor Christian Eriksson (1858–1935), Liss Eriksson grew up on Maria Prästgårdsgatan on Södermalm in southern-central Stockholm. Following his studies at the College of Fine Arts for Nils Sjögren and Eric Grate in 1939–1944, Liss participated in the pioneering exhibition Ung Konst in 1947, before spending five years in Paris together with his wife, the artist Britta Reich-Eriksson, to study for Jean Osouf and Henri Laurens. He returned to Stockholm in 1951, in 1975 succeeding the studio of his father previously used by Sven 'X:et' Erixson (1899–1970). During his last years, he was working on a retable for the church Katarina Church, near his home.

== List of works ==
- Pojke som tittar på månen ("Boy Looking at the Moon"), Stockholm, 1967
- La Mano, (Spanish: The Hand), Stockholm, 1977
- Paret, 1976, Stockholm
- Huset ("The House"), Lund
- Korsgestalten och Den uppståndne ("The Crucified and the Risen"), Strömstad
- Ögat ("The Eye"), Norrtälje
- La Pucelle (French: The Virginity), 1950, Lidingö
- Stående kvinna ("Standing Woman")
- Mor och barn ("Mother and child")
- Ciss III – porträtthuvud ("Ciss III – Portrait")
- Faster ("Aunt"), Västertorp
- FN-monumentet ("The UN Monument"), Djurgården
- Den dövstumme negern ("The Deaf-mute Negro")
- Källan ("The Source"), Stockholm
