= Nicodemus Tessin the Younger =

Swedish architect

Count Nicodemus Tessin the Younger
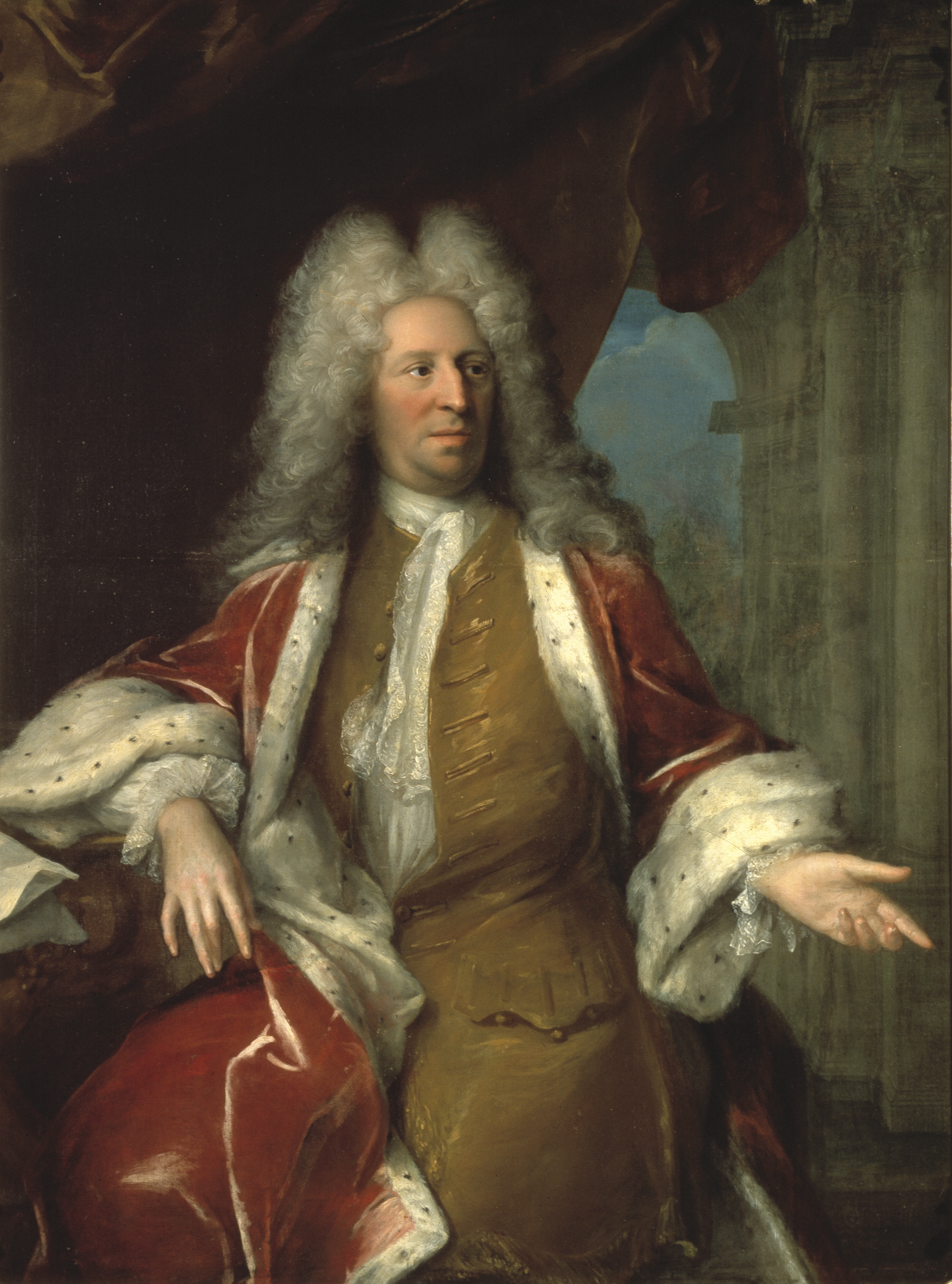
- Portrait by Georg Desmarées, 1723
- Born: 23 May 1654; Nyköping, Södermanland
- Died: 10 April 1728 (aged 73)
- Occupation: Architect
- Buildings: Drottningholm Palace; Stockholm Palace; Tessin Palace

Count Nicodemus Tessin the Younger (23 May 1654 – 10 April 1728) was a Swedish Baroque architect, city planner, and administrator.

The son of Nicodemus Tessin the Elder and the father of Carl Gustaf Tessin, Tessin the Younger was the middle generation of the brief Tessin dynasty, which has had a lasting influence on Swedish architecture and history. Several of his works, including the gardens of Drottningholm Palace, are among the most architecturally significant in Sweden.

== Biography ==
=== Early life ===
Tessin was born on 23 May 1654 as the only child of Nicodemus Tessin the Elder, son of the mayor of Stralsund, and Maria Svan, daughter of the mayor of Västerås. He showed artistic talents at an early age and was given an education in Mathematics and language at Uppsala, where he must have been influenced by Olaus Rudbeck who was at the time highly engaged in the scientific basis of architecture and botany.

In 1673, 19 years old, he accompanied Marchese del Monte, the Emissary of Queen Christina, to Italy and Rome, where the royal protection ensured he would get the best teachers available; leading architects of the era such as Carlo Fontana and Gian Lorenzo Bernini. These architects, together with the compulsory study of classical monuments, made a lasting impression on Tessin. Upon his return to Sweden after four years, King Charles XI of Sweden immediately sent him on a second trip which would last 1677-78 and take him to England and France where prominent architects such as André Le Nôtre and Jean Bérain had a deep impact on Tessin's later decorations and gardens. In 1687-88 he traveled to Rome and back to Sweden through Austria and Germany. During the trip he made extensive notes in a diary describing works of architecture he saw during the journey. Together with his stepbrother Abraham Winands, Tessin actively took part in his father's work, and when Tessin inherited his father's position, he asked to share it with Winands and the two would keep working side by side until the death of Winands in 1709.

=== Work as an architect ===
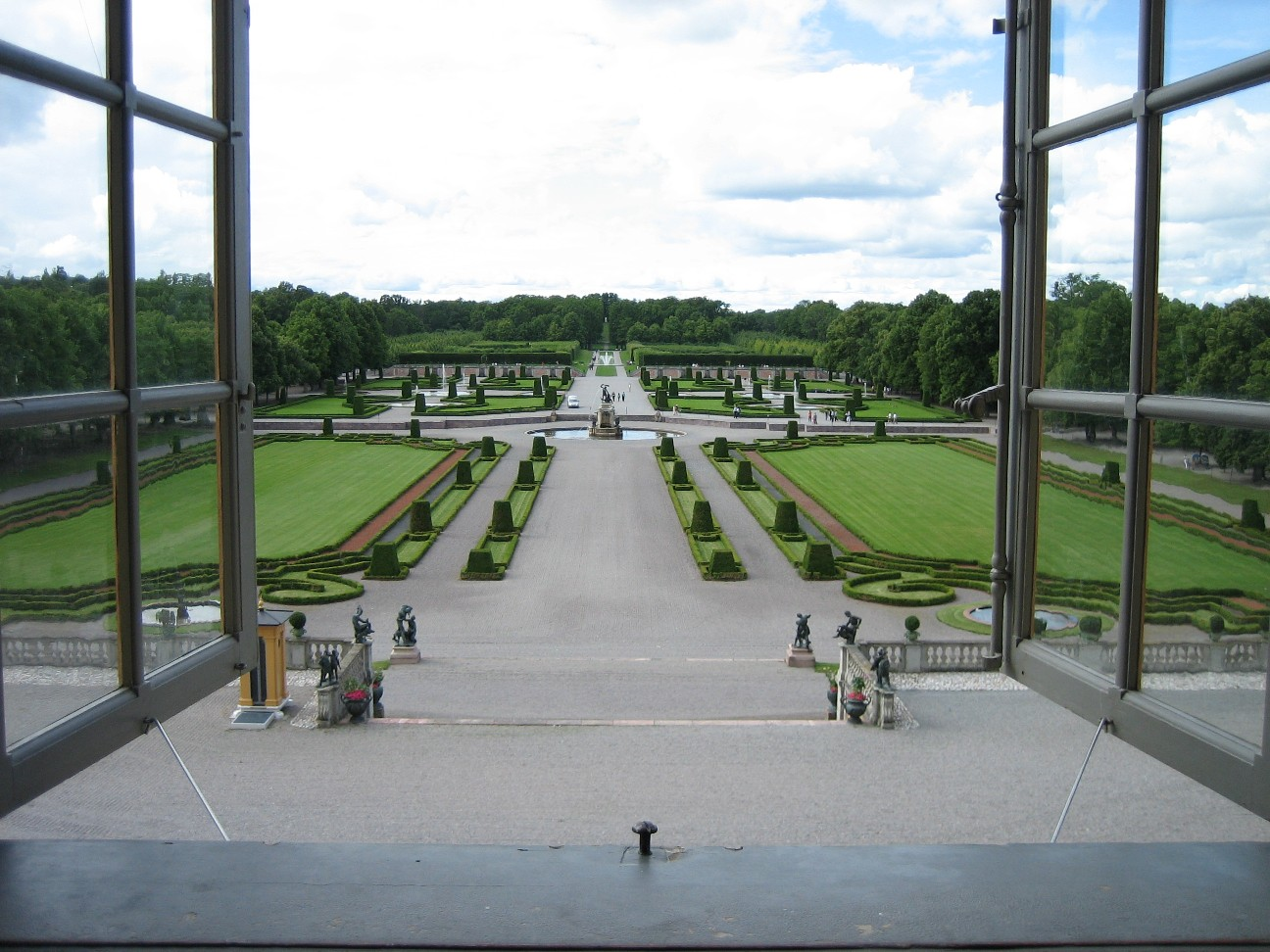
Gardens at Drottningholm.

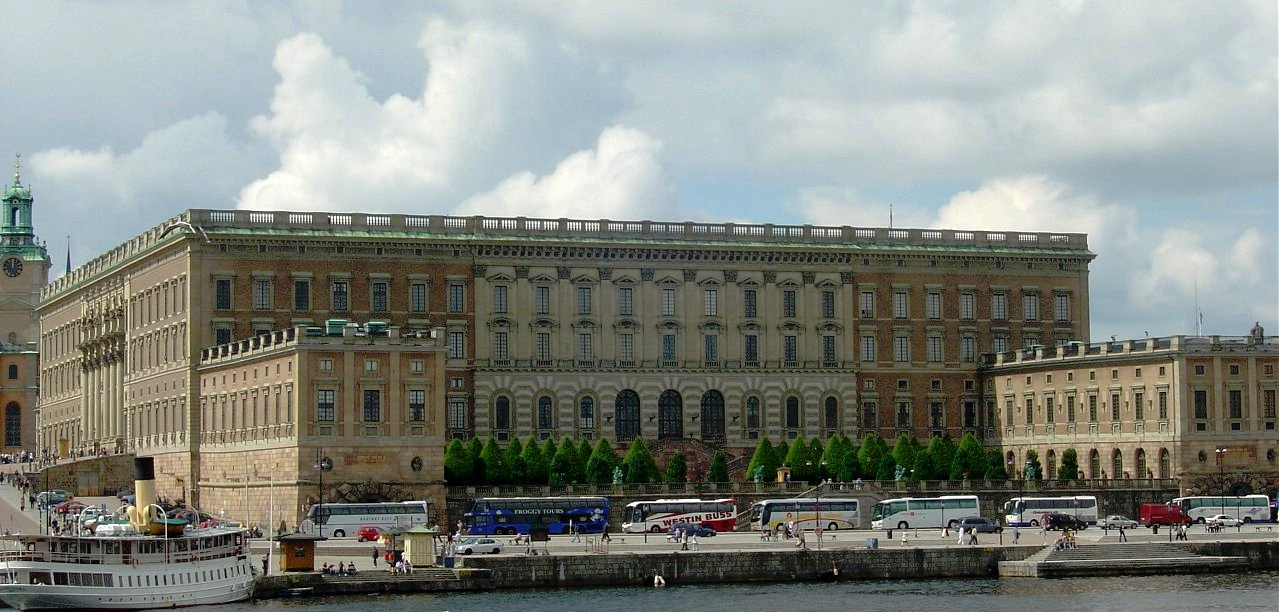
East front of the Stockholm Palace.

When Tessin the Elder came to Stockholm, Sweden was still a major European power and Swedish nobility had the funds required to carry through prestigious architectural projects, a situation which changed dramatically with the Reduction through which the nobility lost their financial power and found themselves sidestepped by highly educated public officials who were gradually raised to nobility. As parts of this latter group, Tessin the Elder was raised to lesser nobility in 1674 and Tessin the Younger became count in 1714. However, the Reduction also meant considerably fewer assignments from the nobility, and when Tessin the Younger succeeded his father in 1681, his main clients was the church and the royal court, with the many ambitious palaces and gardens of Queen Hedvig Elenora as the most important projects.

In the end of the 1680s, King Charles XI commissioned Tessin to modernise the northern part of the Stockholm Palace, why the architect had the opportunity to do a second study tour, including the Netherlands, France, and Italy. This time, however, he was met with great respect all over the continent, and he later proudly retold the event when King Louis XIV of France had the fountains at the Versailles Palace play upon his visit, a tribute normally only granted foreign princes. During this trip Tessin met Daniel Cronström who became one of his invaluable colleagues and an important contact on the continent as Tessin's projects in Sweden required him to negotiate with manufacturers and artists abroad. Their correspondence has also proven invaluable for later historical research. Upon his return he immediately begun his work on the royal palace, and in 1695 his large-scale northern Baroque façade was completed, apparently inspired by Gian Lorenzo Bernini's project at the Louvre. Ambitions to further renew the palace first came to a halt as the king died, and were then given a completely new perspective as the palace was destroyed by fire in 1697. Tessin was appointed to produce plans for a new palace the day after the fire and he quickly produced a proposal which pleased both the young King Charles XII and his regency. However, as Charles XII left Sweden for his lengthy campaigns on the continent in 1700, works on the palace first progressed slowly and following the devastating Battle of Poltava in 1709 came to a new halt. Even though Tessin spent much of his remaining life producing detailed plans for the palace, it remained incomplete by the time of his death.

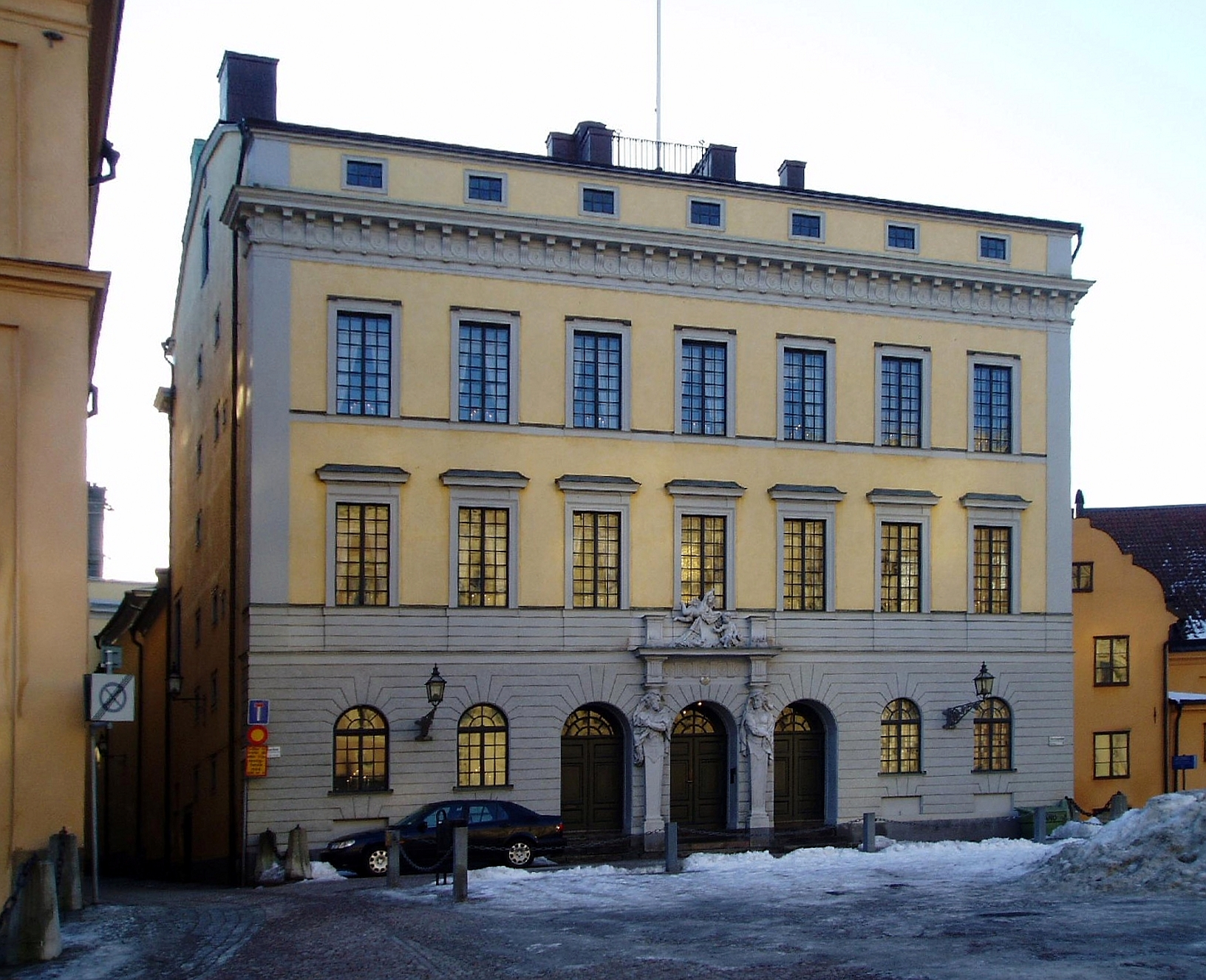
Tessin Palace.

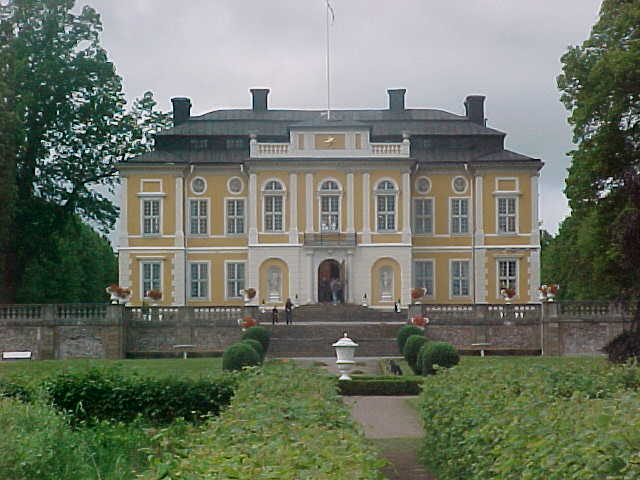
Steninge Palace.

In 1690, Tessin married his mistress Hedvig Eleonora Stenbock (1658–1714), maid of honour of Queen Hedvig Elenora. However, at this time Tessin still belonged to the lesser nobility and his marriage to a woman from the high nobility was regarded as inappropriate. The marriage therefore had to take place secretly in Pomerania and, to repair the situation, Tessin had to produce a residence in accordance to his wife's status. Works on the Tessin Palace begun in 1694 and initially progressed slowly, but in 1697 Tessin and his family could move in and in 1701, two years after Tessin had been promoted to high nobility, the interior was completed to the extent Tessin could invite the widowed queen and the royal family to a supper. Besides his own palace, the gardens of the Drottningholm Palace and Steninge Palace, both located not far from Stockholm, are often pointed out as his greatest achievements.

=== Later life ===
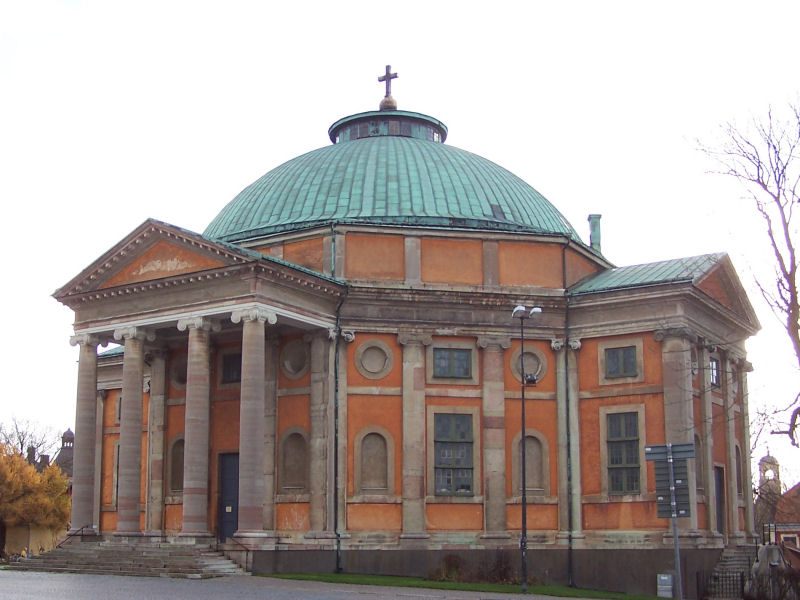
Holy Trinity Church in Karlskrona.

Most of Tessin's projects as an architect were produced during the 17th century, including several churches such the King Charles' Church in Kungsör and the Holy Trinity Church in Karlskrona, and many of his proposals never were built. During his later life, he played an important role as an administrator and he also produced ambitious city plans for Stockholm in connection to his work for the royal palace.

== Progeny ==
- Tessin the Younger was the father of Carl Gustaf Tessin, one of the most influential Swedish politicians of his time.
- Carl Erik Tessin
- Hedvig Tessin von Schwerin
- Ulrika Maria Tessin Sparre, she was the mother of Fredrik Sparre, who was Lord High Chancellor of Sweden in the 1790s.

== Selected works ==
- Stockholm Palace
- Tessin Palace, (1694–1700)
- Steninge Palace
- Completion of the Drottningholm Palace
- Gottorp, Schleswig, (1697–1703)
- Holy Trinity Church, Karlskrona
- King Charles' Church, Kungsör
- Västra/Östra boställshuset, Stockholm
