= Finnish Church, Stockholm =

Coordinates: 59.3256°N 18.0722°E

Finnish Church
- Finska kyrkan
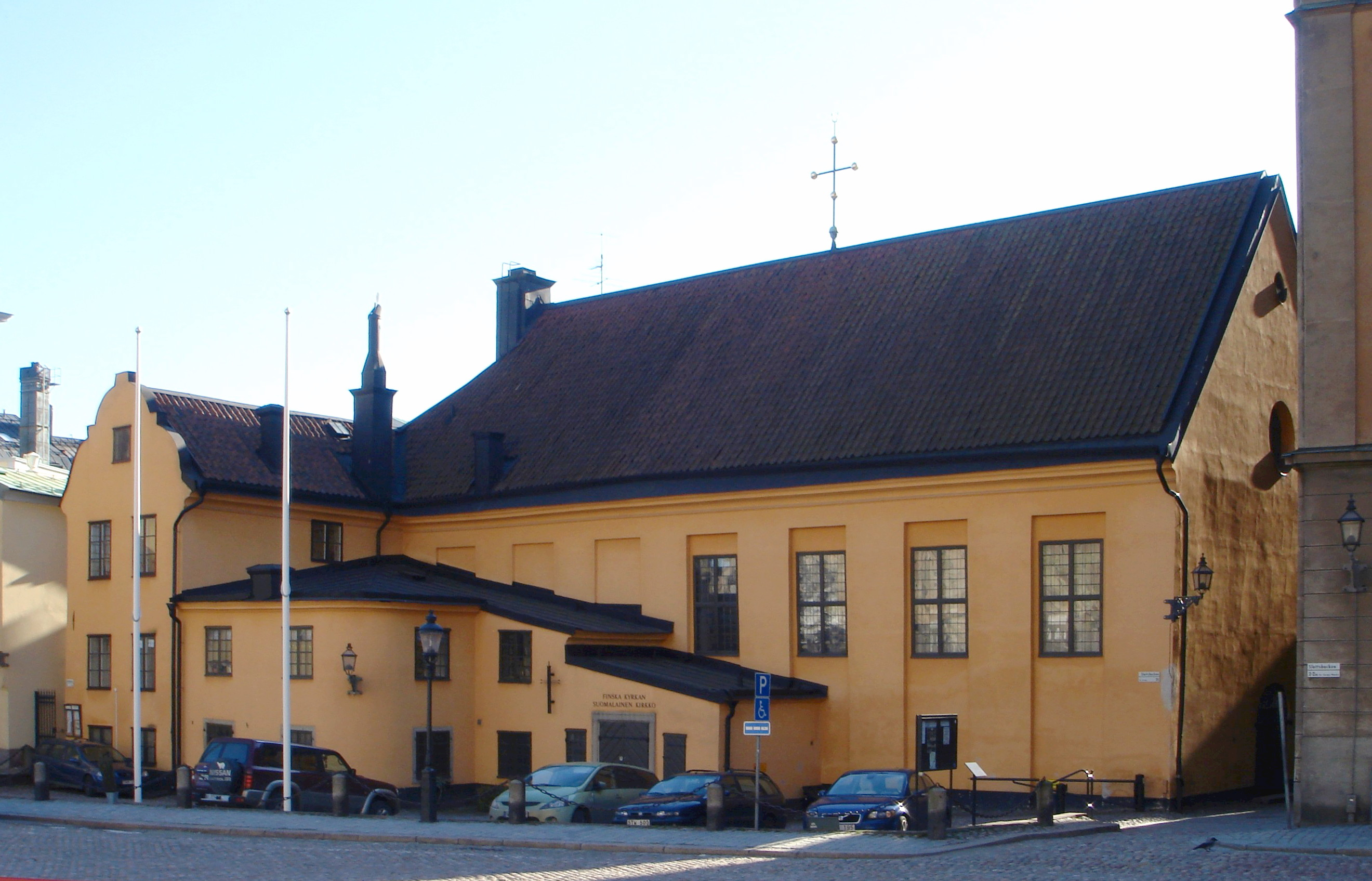
- The Finnish Church in April 2008
- Finnish Church
- Location: Stockholm
- Country: Sweden
- Denomination: Church of Sweden

Administration
- Diocese: Stockholm
- Parish: Stockholm Finnish Parish

The Finnish Church (Finnish: Suomalainen kirkko, Swedish: Finska kyrkan) is a church building in Gamla stan in Stockholm, Sweden. Belonging to the Stockholm Finnish Parish of the Church of Sweden, it was opened in 1725 after the Lilla Bollhuset building had been rebuilt into a church.

== See also ==
- Bollhustäppan
