= Meyer (family of bronze casters) =

Dynasty of bronze casters of German origin

The family name Meyer (also Meijer, Meier, Maier) stands for a dynasty of bronze casters of German origin, documented between the late 16th and the end of the 18th century, active in Copenhagen, Florence, Helsingør, Riga, Stockholm and Tallinn. They were predominantly cannon and bell casters and occasionally statue casters. Over generations they were casters to the City of Riga and to the King of Sweden mainly in Stockholm. As wandering journeymen, members of this bronze-casting dynasty had to travel to complete their training before becoming master craftsmen. From the Middle Ages, bronze casters were highly skilled craftsmen who were much sought after and thus often travelled long distances across Europe and beyond to where their technical expertise was called for. Courts typically competed to secure the services of the best casters.

A North-German origin of the Meyer family is most likely. Hans Meyer, member of the first known generation of this family, had relations to Lübeck, an important Hanseatic city with long tradition in metal casting. He himself wrote in Low-German, as is customary in Northern Germany. It is possible that he was related to another Hans Meyer, "by der Trave", who was the son-in-law of Lübeck's foremost caster Karsten Middeldorp (+1561). The misreading of a cannon's inscription led in the past to the false assumption that the Meyer family were of Nuremberg origin. The German origin is stated on the epitaph of the Swedish branch of the Meyer family in the Klara Church in Stockholm (“Origine Germano”), erected in 1761.

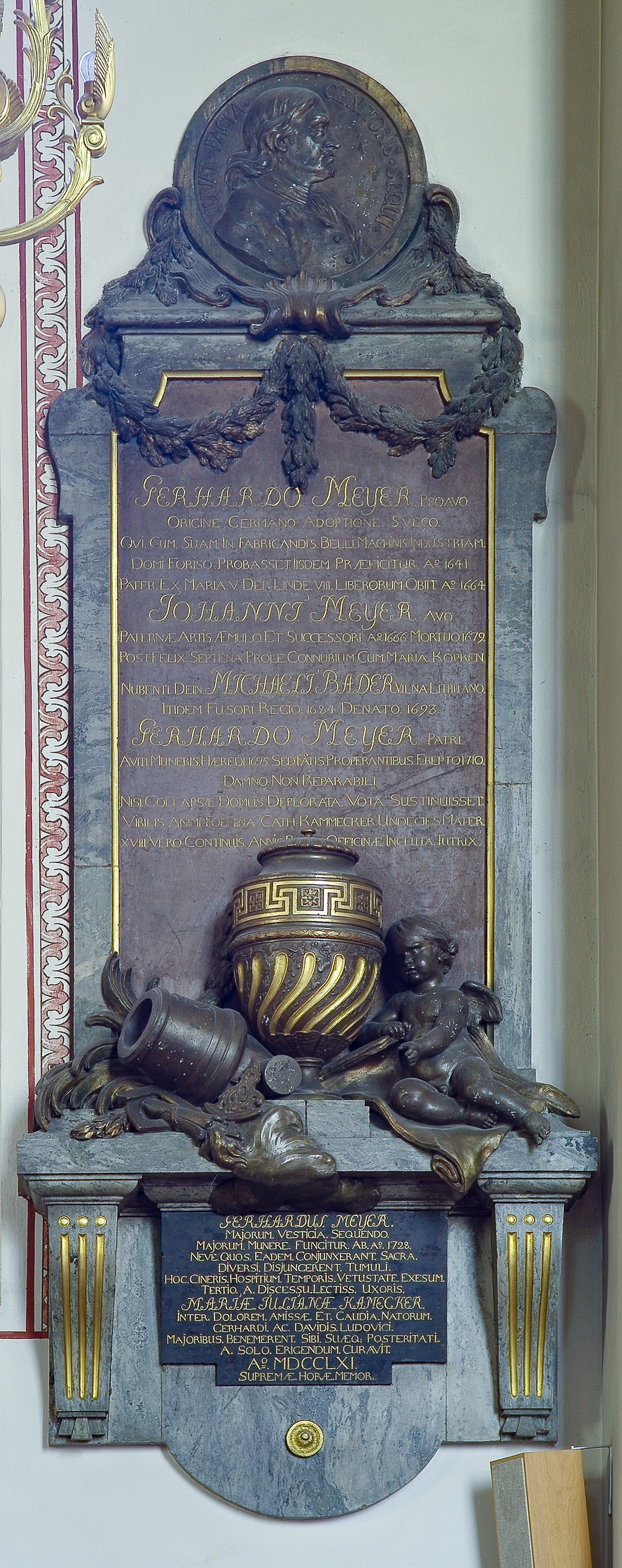
Epitaph of the Meyer family, erected in 1761. Stockholm, Klara church

There are many pieces preserved cast by members of the Meyer family, documented or signed. Signatures have sometimes led to confusion since given names, as per common practice at the time, were repeatedly used in the family. Over six generations, seven Gerhardt (Gärdt, Gerdt, Gert, Gertts, Gerhard) and eight Johann (Hans) are known. Sometimes these have been mixed up in the literature.

The confusion is made more challenging as different members of the family used the same signature, often punched with the same set of punches, which were passed on over generations. As was customary for their profession, bronze casters of the Meyer family throughout all generations signed their casts using the traditional formula which let the piece itself speak: either in Latin "Me fecit…" (I was made by...) or German "mich goß…" (I was cast by...). On many casts made by members of the Meyer family the signature was made with punches. Over generations, casts dating from the late 16th to the mid-18th century were marked with the same set of punches. As was standard practice, they did note use the punches for marking bells. As some of these letter punches were gradually worn, single letters or numbers were replaced over time.

The two earliest known casters of this dynasty are Johann (I), who died 1610, and Gerhardt (I). The latter, coming from Stockholm, briefly joined Johann (I) in his workshop in Riga in 1596 before moving on to Italy. It is not certain how they were related.

== State of research ==
Most of the literature dealing with history and oeuvre of the Meyer family has a local context. Their activity in Riga was part of a vast research by the Latvian architect Paul Campe (1885–1960) who first published his results in a comprehensive publication in 1930. His unpublished material about the subject is preserved in Marburg (DSHI). He also contributed the basic articles in Thieme-Becker. Information about the family members active in Stockholm is given in Nordisk Familjebook 1904–26, Vol. XIII, 1290, Svenska Konstnärer o.J. (1955), 257, and Svenskt Konstnärslexikon o.J. [1961], Vol. IV, 118. In these contributions the connections between the branches of the family active in various places have not been sufficiently understood. Extensive research of the related archival material mainly in Latvia and Sweden has recently increased the basic knowledge about the Meyer family. The chronology is based on a family tree covering the time from 1582 to 1797 published by A. Rudigier and B. Truyols in 2019.

== Family workshops and their masters ==
=== Riga ===
==== Johann (I) ====
Johann (I), also called Hans, died in 1610. He must have spent time, possibly as a wandering journeyman, in Lübeck. This can be derived from a dispute he had with the guild in Lübeck, when he was already in Riga. The guild accused him of having poached assistants from his colleagues there. He seems to have been for some time in military service as in the abovementioned dispute his first wife was pejoratively referred to as a soldiers’ moll (öffentliche Haerhure). The high-tech knowledge and skill of cannon-casters was constantly needed in the army. After years of travel in military service Hans Meyer came to Riga, at the time a German-speaking town, to become assistant to the caster to the City Michel Baier. Before 1582 he took over Baier's workshop and was appointed his successor in 1585. Meyer was in permanent scuffle with the Riga guild and became a member only in 1594. The inscription on a bell he made for St. Peter's church in 1585 is a testimony of his difficult circumstances: "In Gottes Namen hat mich Hans Meyer gegossen, das hat manigen verdrose" (In the Name of God Hans Meyer cast me, which did annoy some people). Hans died in 1610. He left behind his second wife Catarina Bordinck and at least three underage children. Catarina continued to run the workshop until around 1612 when it was taken over by Medardus Gessus (Gesus, Gisus) from Constance whom she possibly married. Hans Meyer is said to have been the best caster ever active in Latvia. Some of his cannons (called “Buchse” in 16th century German) are still preserved.

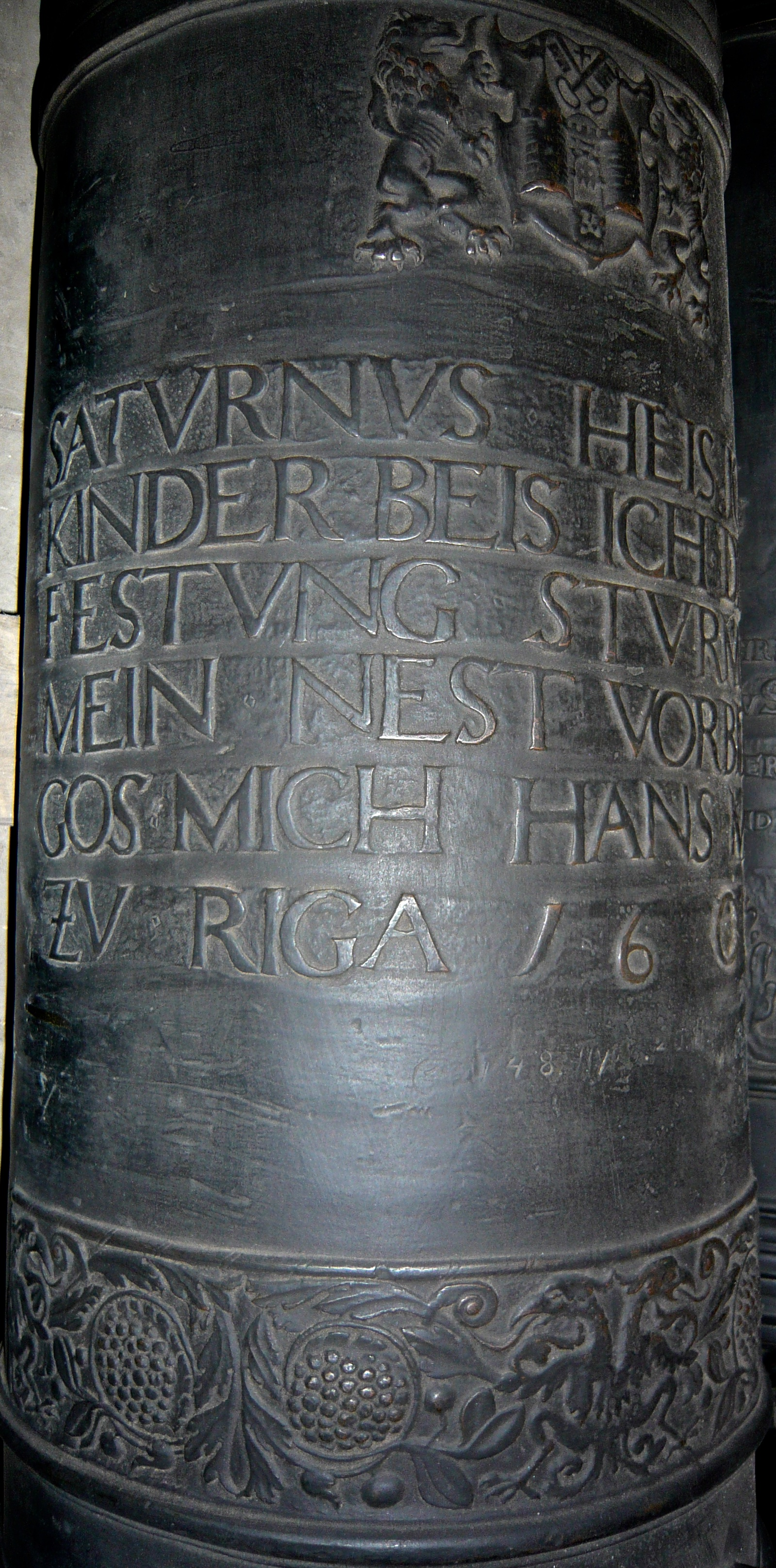
Caster's inscription on the 12-pounder „Saturnus“, cast by Johann I Meyer, Riga, 1600. Riga, Museum of the History of Riga and Navigation

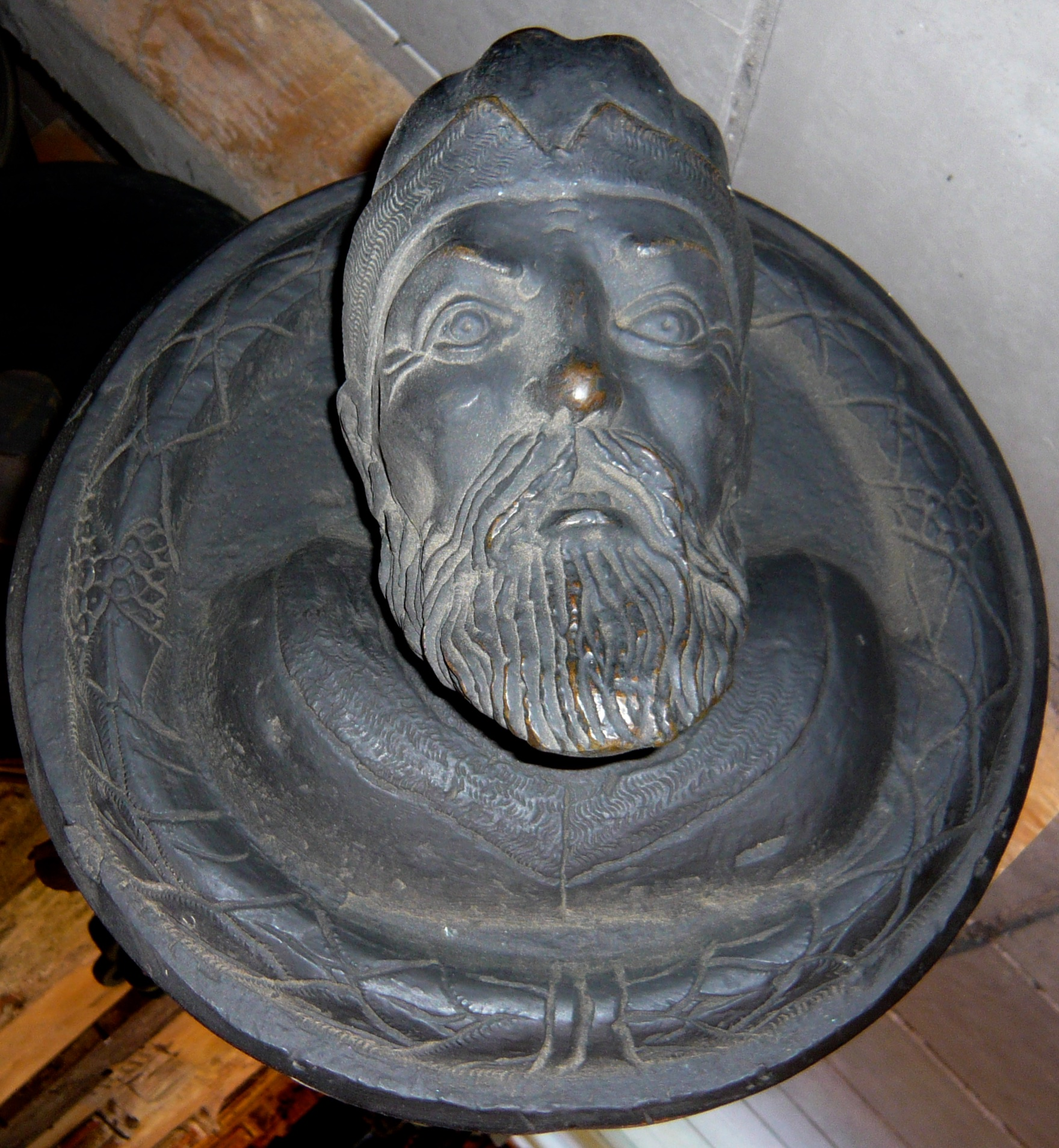
Knob („Traube“) of the cannon „Johannes“, cast by Johann I Meyer, Riga 1600. Riga, Museum of the History of Riga and Navigation

==== Georg ====
Georg, also called Jürgen or Gorgen, died in 1657. He was the son of Johann (I) and may have learned in 1610, still underaged, under his father's successor, the itinerant caster Medardus Gessus. Georg himself became caster to the City of Riga in 1627 after master Medardus, possibly his stepfather, had left Riga for Stockholm in 1623. Four years later, in 1631, he was awarded citizenship. He died before November 23, 1657, and left behind a wife Anna Bruens (died after 1663) and a son named Johann, whose profession is unknown.

==== Gerhardt (III) ====
Gerhardt (III) lived from 1644 until 1701. As the son of Gerhardt (II) and Georg's nephew, he was born in Stockholm in 1644. Joining his father's and his uncle's business, he was active first in Tallinn and then in Riga where he was appointed caster to the City in 1671, a position that he held until his death. In 1677 he was awarded citizenship of Riga but remained a lifelong member of the Stockholm guild, which at times caused conflicts given his public position. Gerhardt (III) succeeded in casting bells and cannons.

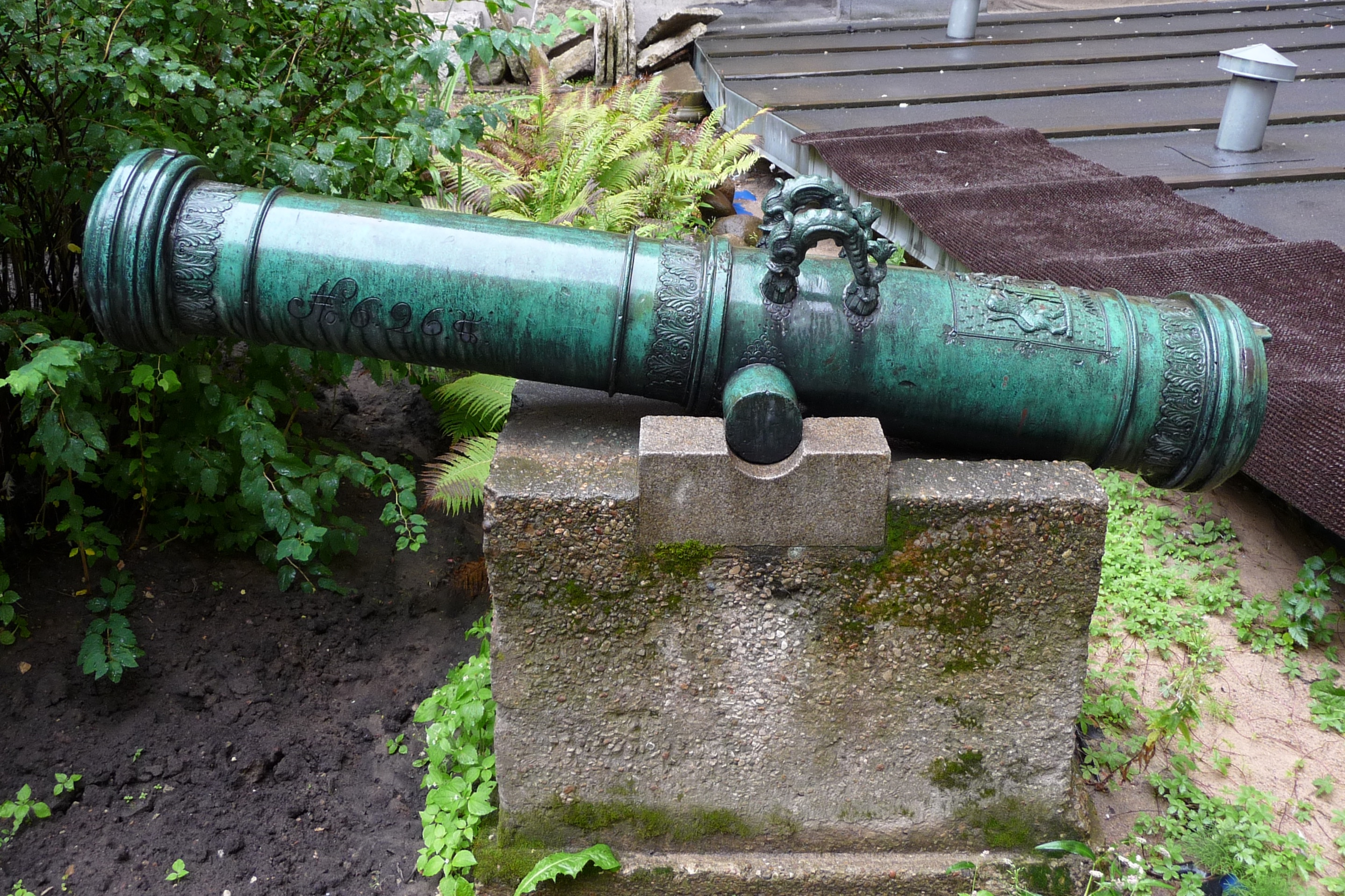
Cannon, cast by Gerhardt III Meyer, Riga 1672. Riga, Castle

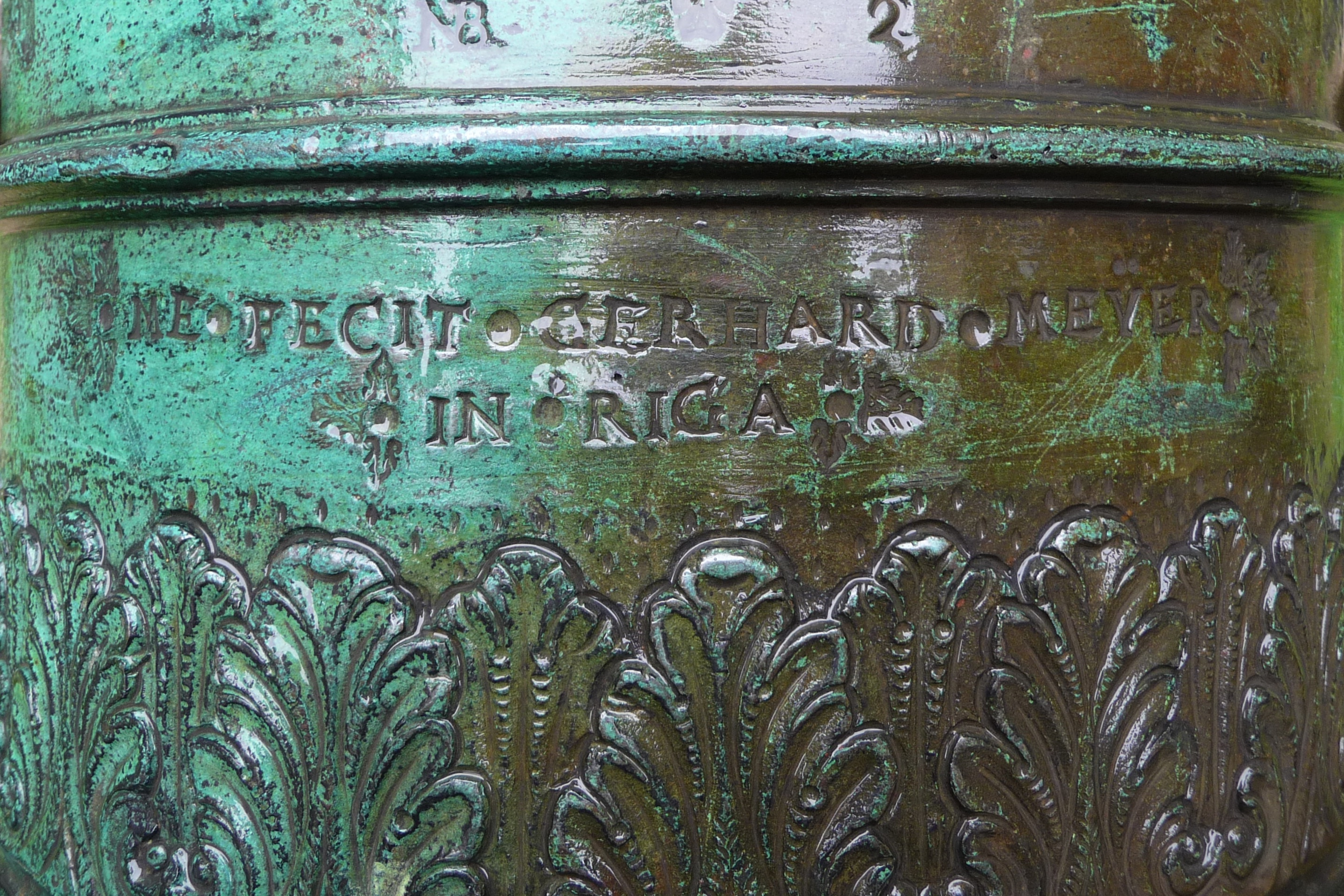
Caster's signature by Gerhardt III Meyer. Cannon, Riga 1672. Riga, Castle

The number of 36 ordnances and 35 church bells preserved, testify his vast production. With his death in 1701 the activity of the Meyer family in Riga seems to have ended. Nothing is known about his son Gerhardt (V), born in 1682.

=== Helsingör - Copenhagen ===
==== Johann (II) ====
Johann (II) died in 1669. He was son of Johann (I)) and, like his siblings, underage in 1610, the year of his father's death. He must have received part of his formation like his brothers Georg and Gerhardt from Medardus Gessus. In 1637 he was appointed head of the Royal Danish foundry in Helsingör with the salary paid out of the Öresund toll. In 1640 he took over this foundry and became independent, losing the privilege of casting cannons which was restricted to foundries which were under direct control of the state. Over 20 church bells cast by him are known today. One of his bells, made for Kronborg Castle, was the biggest bell cast in Denmark until then. In 1655 he was appointed head of the Royal foundry in Copenhagen, with casting guns as his primarily occupation. At this time cannon production in three important places of the Baltic, Copenhagen, Riga and Stockholm, were in the hands of the three sons of Johann (I) Meyer. The difficult economic situation due to King Christian IV's unsuccessful military enterprises brought loss of production in the years 1657–60. Johann (II) held his position until his death in 1669. Among the children he had with his Danish wife Sophia was Hans (Johann) born in 1645. His godfather was Claus van Damm of a Hamburg-based family of casters and Johann (I)’s predecessor as head of the Copenhagen foundry.

=== Stockholm ===
==== Gerhardt (I) ====
The first member of the Meyer family linked with the Swedish capital is Gerhardt (I): "Me fecit Gerhardt Meyer Holmiae" – Holmia is the Latin name for Stockholm – is the caster's signature on a bronze sculpture of a Bathing Venus (1597). In the years 1592–1595 a Gärt (Gerhardt) Meyer is documented in Stockholm. He seems to have left the Swedish capital in 1596 by moving to Riga, where he was briefly active in Hans Meyer's workshop. Hans and Gerhardt must have been close relatives. Under Hans Meyer as head of the foundry, Gerhardt must have cast the monumental candelabrum for St. Peter's church.

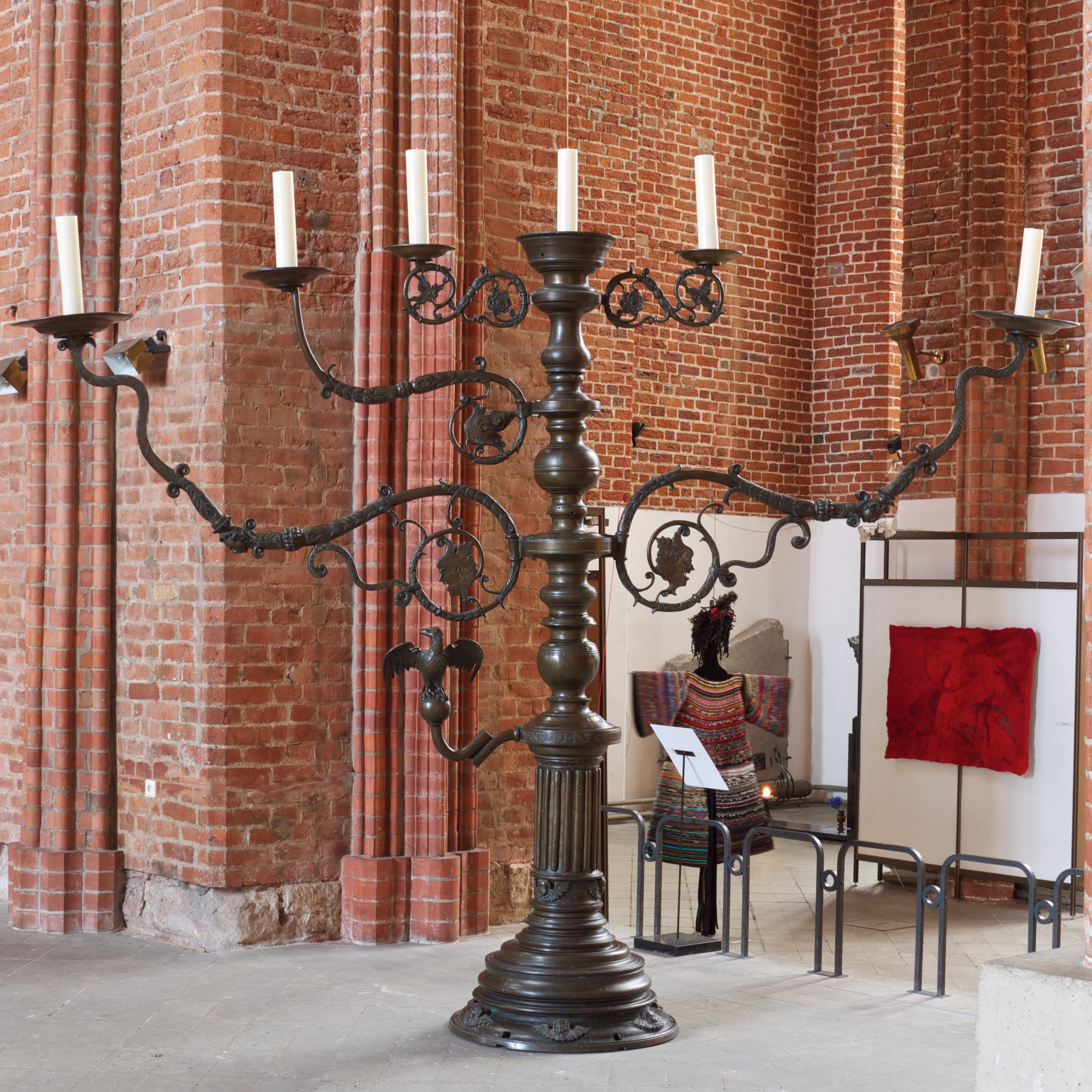
Pasqual candelabrum, cast by Gerhardt I Meyer, Riga 1596. Riga, St. Peter's church (2012)

The next year he appears in Florence where he cast the Bathing Venus for Giambologna, court sculptor of the Medici. In Florence he appears to have joined the German-speaking community, which gathered in the Compagnia di Santa Barbara, a religious brotherhood. In their documents a "Gherardo fiammingho" is mentioned shortly after the cast of the Venus. Thanks to the reuse of his set of punches by later generations of his family one can assume that Gerhardt (I) returned to Sweden at some point. He could be identical with a homonymous goldsmith (Giert Meyer), active in Stockholm between 1626 and 1631. This goldsmith Meyer was a protégé of Erich Larsson von der Linde, future father-in-law of Gerhardt (II). At the time it was not unusual for trained goldsmiths to be active in the challenging bronze-casting of monumental figures: Benvenuto Cellini and Balthazar Keller are two famous examples.

==== Gerhardt (II) ====
Gerhard (II), also known as Gert, died in 1655. A permanent activity in Stockholm started with him, a son of Johann (I). Born in Riga and at his father's death in 1610 still underaged, he got his formation by his master (and possibly stepfather) Medardus Gessus. In 1621 Riga was conquered by the Swedes and in 1623 Gessus was appointed head of the Royal cannon foundry in the Swedish capital. Gerhardt is mentioned amongst Gessus’ assistants in the same year. He later became the leading bronze caster to the Swedish Crown. The challenging industry of bronze cannons (in 17th century Swedish called "Stycke") was one of the key military tasks at the time. Meyer established well in his new homeland; in 1635 he married Maria von der Linde, daughter of Erich Larsson von der Linde, one of the richest merchants in town. Gerhardt (II) owned a house in the city and had his own seat in the German Church, Stockholm St. Gertrud's. He made proposals to Queen Christina to improve the founding industry. In 1641 he was appointed head of the Royal foundry by the Queen. On this occasion the old foundry in Brunkeberg near St. Klara church was rebuilt in order to provide the master with a modern workshop. Unlike his predecessors as founders of the King of Sweden, Gerhardt owned the foundry. Besides cannon-casting, bell-casting was an important source of income, particularly in times when there was little need for artillery. The king passed a decree to allow his cannon casters to cast bells. In 1655 Meyer was granted the permission to cast not only for the Crown but also for important aristocrats. He was rich enough to rebuild the foundry at his own expense after it was destroyed by fire. In 1647 he executed the bronze cast of a man wielding a whip for the pillory on Stortorget square, the so-called "Kopparmatte" after a model by the German “bilthacker” (wood sculptor) Jost Henne or Martin Redtmer. This was the first bronze statue ever cast in Sweden; today it is in the collection of the Stockholm Stadtsmuseet.

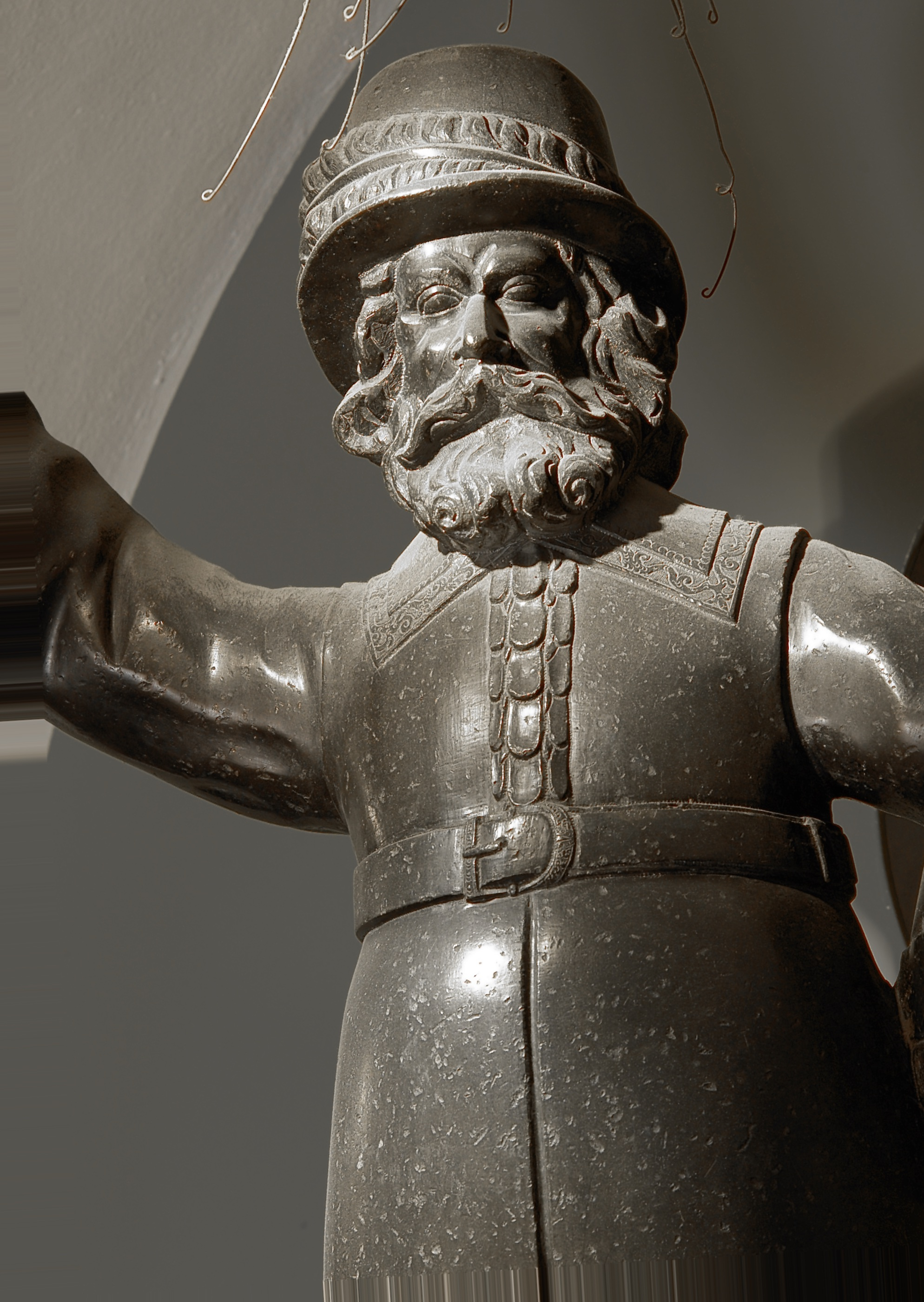
Kopparmatte, cast by Gerhardt II Meyer, Stockholm 1647. Stockholm, Stadsmuseum

Gerhardt (II) died in 1655. His wife Maria obtained permission to carry on with the workshop.

==== Johann (IV) ====
Johann (IV) lived c. 1636–1679. As a son of Gerhardt (II) he was born circa 1636. He received his privilege as caster to the crown in 1655, the year of his father's death. In 1658 he became liveryman of the Stockholm guild and from 1666 he was head of the Royal foundry. He is said to have been active as gun and bell caster in Sweden as well as in Finland, where seven of his bells are known.

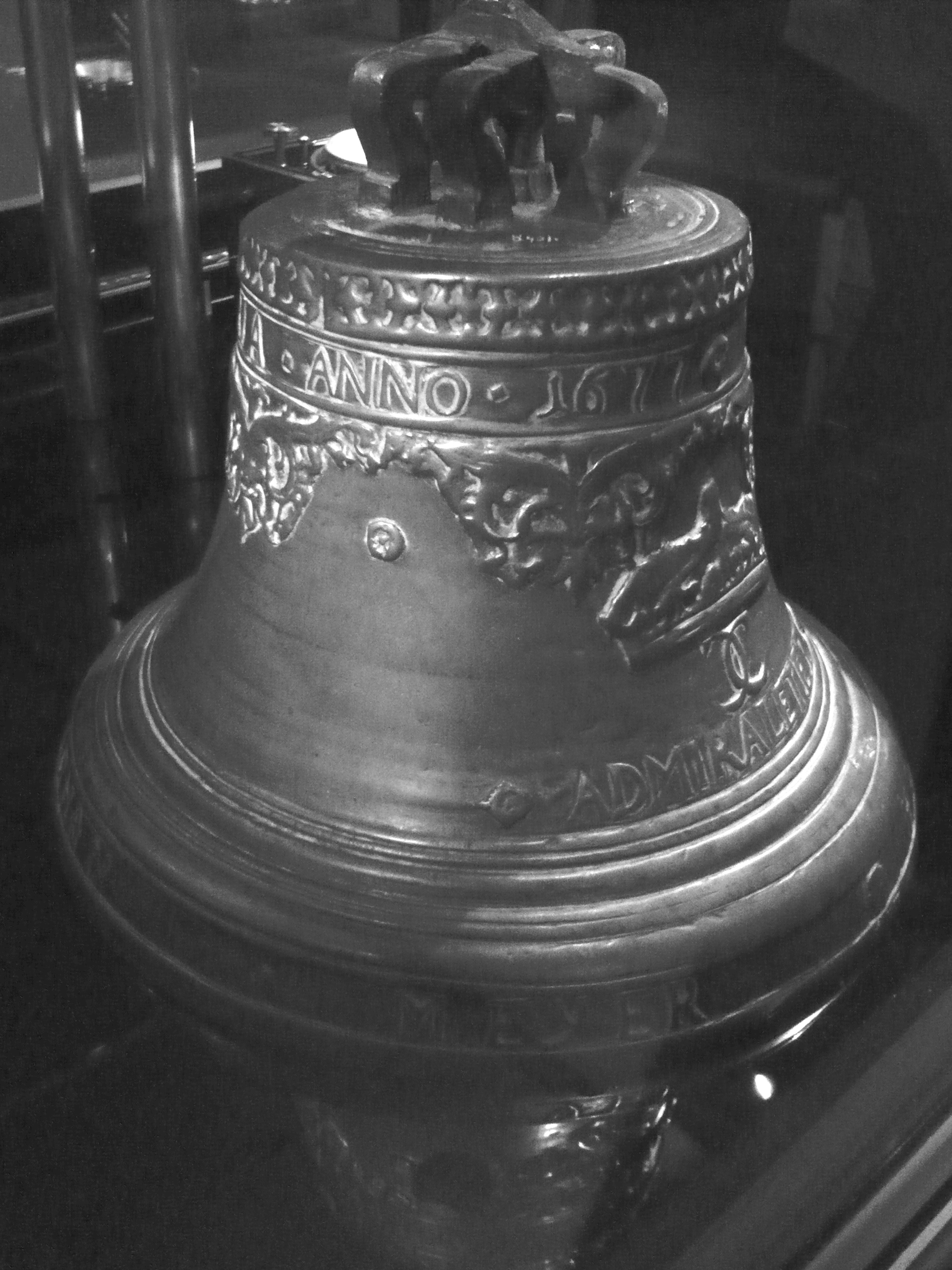
Naval bell, cast by Johann IV Meyer, Stockholm 1677. Stockholm, Nationalmuseum

Few of his cannons are preserved, all made between 1665 and 1677.

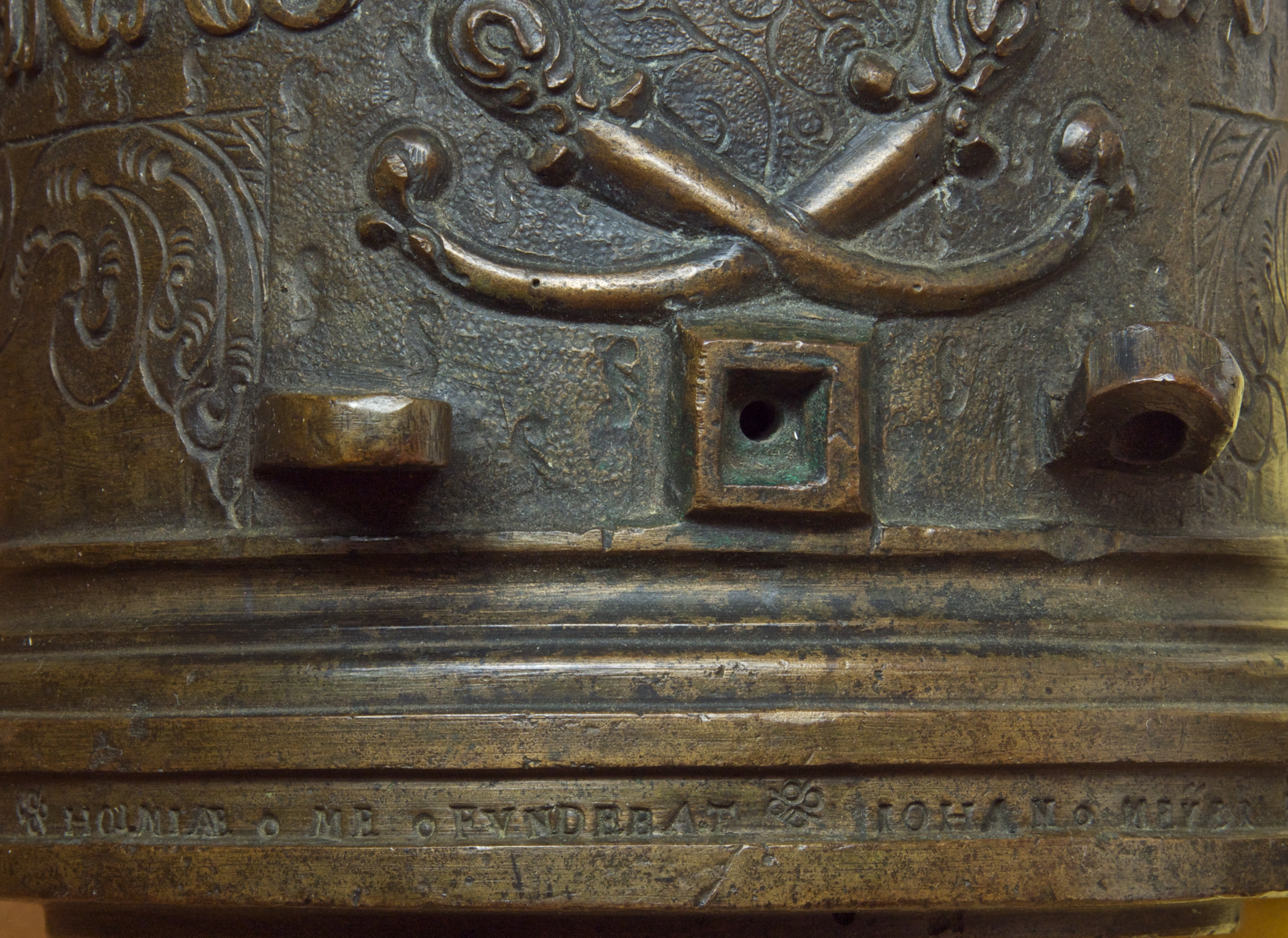
Cannon, cast by Johann IV Meyer, Stockholm 1675. Stockholm, Armémuseum AM 49709

As was already granted to his father, Johann was also permitted to work for Swedish aristocrats like Magnus de la Gardie. After his death in 1679 the workshop was continued by his widow Maria Köpke, who then ran the business together with her second husband Michael Bader from Vilnius.

==== Gerhardt (IV) ====
Gerhardt (IV) lived from 1667 until 1710. As a son of Johann (IV) he was born in 1667. He got his formation in his father's and in his stepfather's workshop before travelling as a wandering journeyman to Germany to continue his training. Business had become tough by then. Whereas Gerhardt's ancestors and predecessors in charge of the Royal foundry had their major commissions due to the modernisation of Swedish artillery, it seems that the implementation of modern cannon types had been mostly completed at the time. Furthermore, there was in Sweden a notorious lack of copper since the 1640s, severely restricting the production of cannons. Yet, the king's ambitious plans for the embellishment of the new residence opened new fields of activity. Since 1693 there were ongoing construction works for a new Royal Stockholm Palace after the plans by Nicodemus Tessin the Younger. For that purpose, a whole team of French artists and artisans came over the following years to Stockholm, including the French caster Jean Hubeault who made ornamental casts for the decoration of the palace. It was planned to decorate the new palace with monumental bronze sculptures. Casting bronze sculptures was a task so far unknown in Sweden. The only exception had been the above-mentioned Kopparmatte, which from a technical point of view is merely a rather rudimentary achievement.

In January 1693 Meyer asked the king for permission and support to travel to France in order to improve his skills and to learn the French practices in figure-casting. The request was granted to him and in July 1693 he left Stockholm for an apprenticeship at Jean-Balthazar Keller (1638–1702), who at the time was caster to Louis XIV in Paris. Only two months later, in September 1693, Gerhardt's stepfather Michael Bader died, which would have required his return to Stockholm. As the Swedish king guaranteed that the foundry would remain in the family's hands, Meyer delayed his return to Stockholm until July 1694. Keller was displeased with Meyer who not only wanted to leave his master before but also tried to take two of his assistants with him to Sweden.

In 1695, back in Sweden, he became liveryman of the Stockholm guild, head of the Royal foundry and married in the very same year Catharina Kammecker. Soon after, Meyer wrote to the king offering to cast "large metal statues and other decorations" as well as iron "stoves", works which Meyer pretended to be able to execute thanks to his French experiences. He requested to the Royal artillery department (War College) permission to be also allowed to cast portrait busts, statues and other kind of works in order to secure the financial success of his workshop.

Nicodemus Tessin distrusted Meyer and investigated with Keller in Paris about his former apprentice and his capacities in figure-casting. Keller reported that Meyer – during his relatively short stay – only attended the final steps of the cast of an equestrian statuette and that he lacked knowledge about the decisive preparatory steps in casting such as making the core investment, building armature or melting the wax. In comparison to the cast of a statuette the cast of a monumental bronze sculpture is by far more challenging. In the words of the Swedish envoy in Paris, Daniel Cronström, Meyer would not be capable of carrying out a large-size figure cast (“grande ouvrage”) without help. As a result of these enquiries, the French caster François Aubry was hired from Paris to cast the sculptures for the Royal palace. He arrived in Stockholm in May 1697. There is no evidence that Gerhardt (IV) did ever cast a figure.

There has been an attempt to attribute the cast of Giambologna's Bathing Venus of 1597 to Gerhardt (IV). However, the date 1597 on the Venus is paleographically undoubtedly. Nonetheless, it has been argued, that the 5 in the date of Gerhardt I's signature would originally have been, on the casting model, a 6 which did transform itself during the casting process accidentally into a 5. Therefore, the date should be interpreted as 1697 enabling the attribution of the cast to Gerhardt (IV). This assumption has been disproved on technical grounds and is contradicted by natural scientific evidence, which excludes a casting date after 1648 with a probability of 99.75%.

Today some cannons and a large number of church bells cast by Gerhardt (IV) are preserved. He and three of his children died in the plague of 1710. His widow ran the business after her husband's untimely death.

==== Gerhardt (VI) ====
Gerhardt (VI) lived from 1704 until 1784. As a son of Gerhardt (IV) he was in 1720, ten years after his father's death, at the age of 16 already appointed Royal cannon caster by King Frederic I. He moved to Uppsala and in 1724 he started a three-year journey through Europe, where he was an apprentice in foundries in Germany (possibly in Nuremberg), Switzerland, France, The Netherlands and England. After his return to Stockholm he became head of the Royal foundry in 1728, following his father and his grandfather. His main business must have been bell-casting, as in Finland alone 47 bells of his hand are preserved. Besides, he made bronze casts after models of the leading French artists of the time: busts of the Swedish Kings Charles XII (1747/48) and Adolf Frederick (1749/51) after Jacques-Philippe Bouchardon as well as puttoes and ornamental shields for the staircase of the Royal Palace.

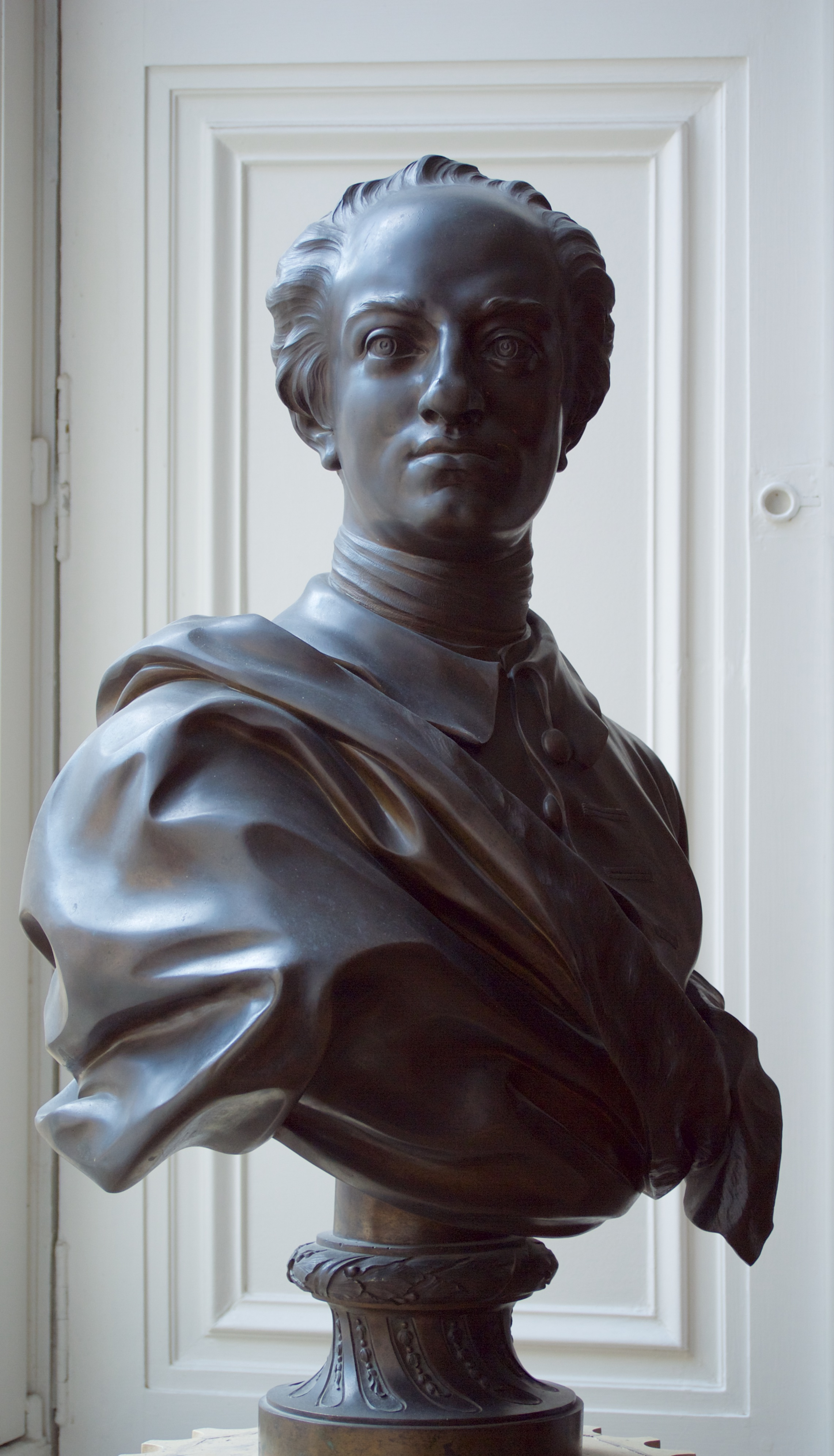
King Charles XII of Sweden, bust cast by Gerhardt VI Meyer, Stockholm 1648. Paris, Musée du Louvre

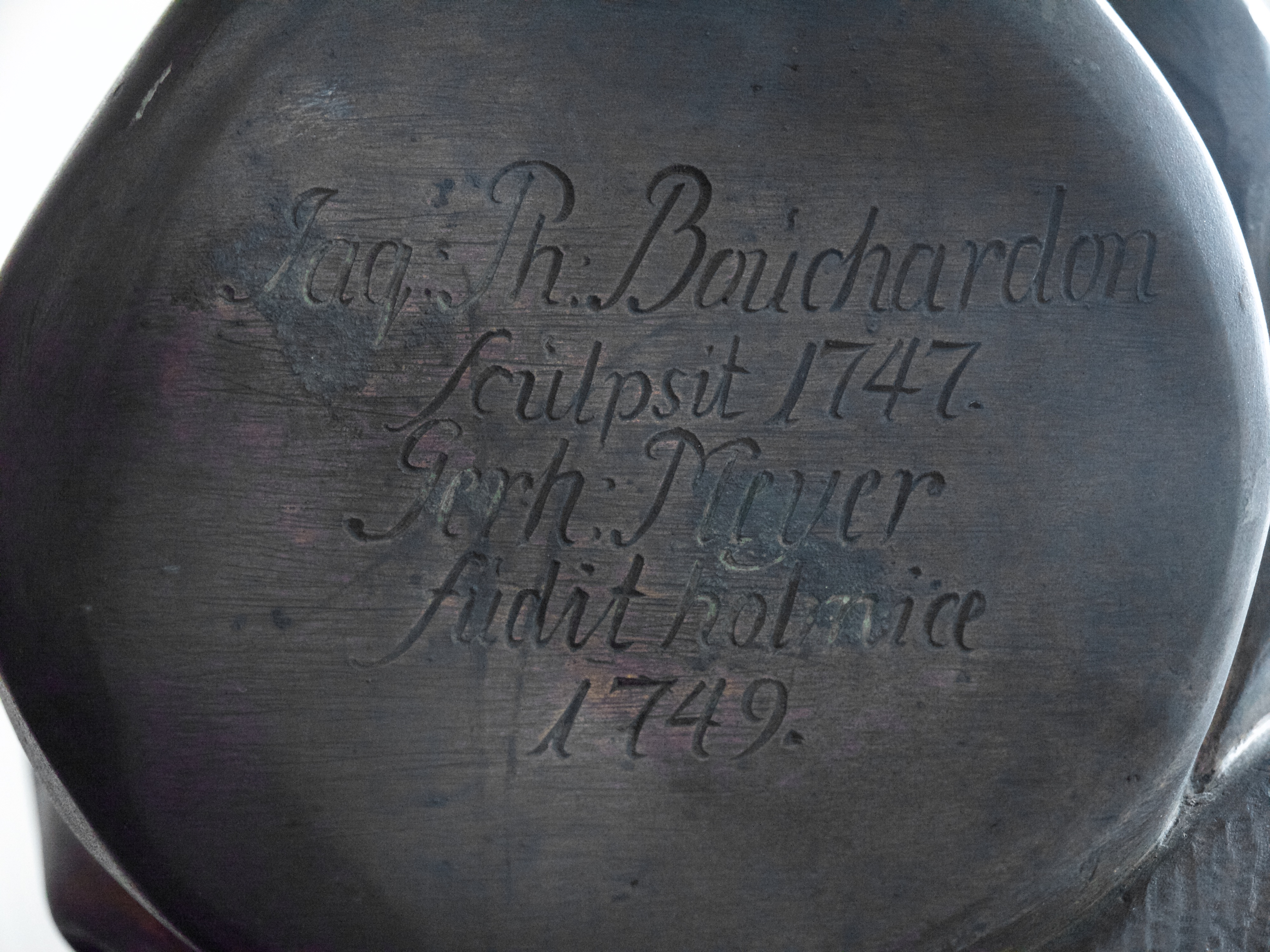
Caster's signature by Gerhardt VI Meyer on the bust of King Charles XII, Stockholm 1748, Paris, Musée du Louvre

He cast the monuments of King Gustav Wasa in 1770 (Stockholm, Riddarhus Square) after a model by Pierre Hubert L'Archevêque and in 1779 the equestrian monument of King Gustav Adolf (Stockholm, Gustav Adolfs square), after models by L'Archevêque and Johan Tobias Sergel. The latter was the first equestrian monument made in Sweden.

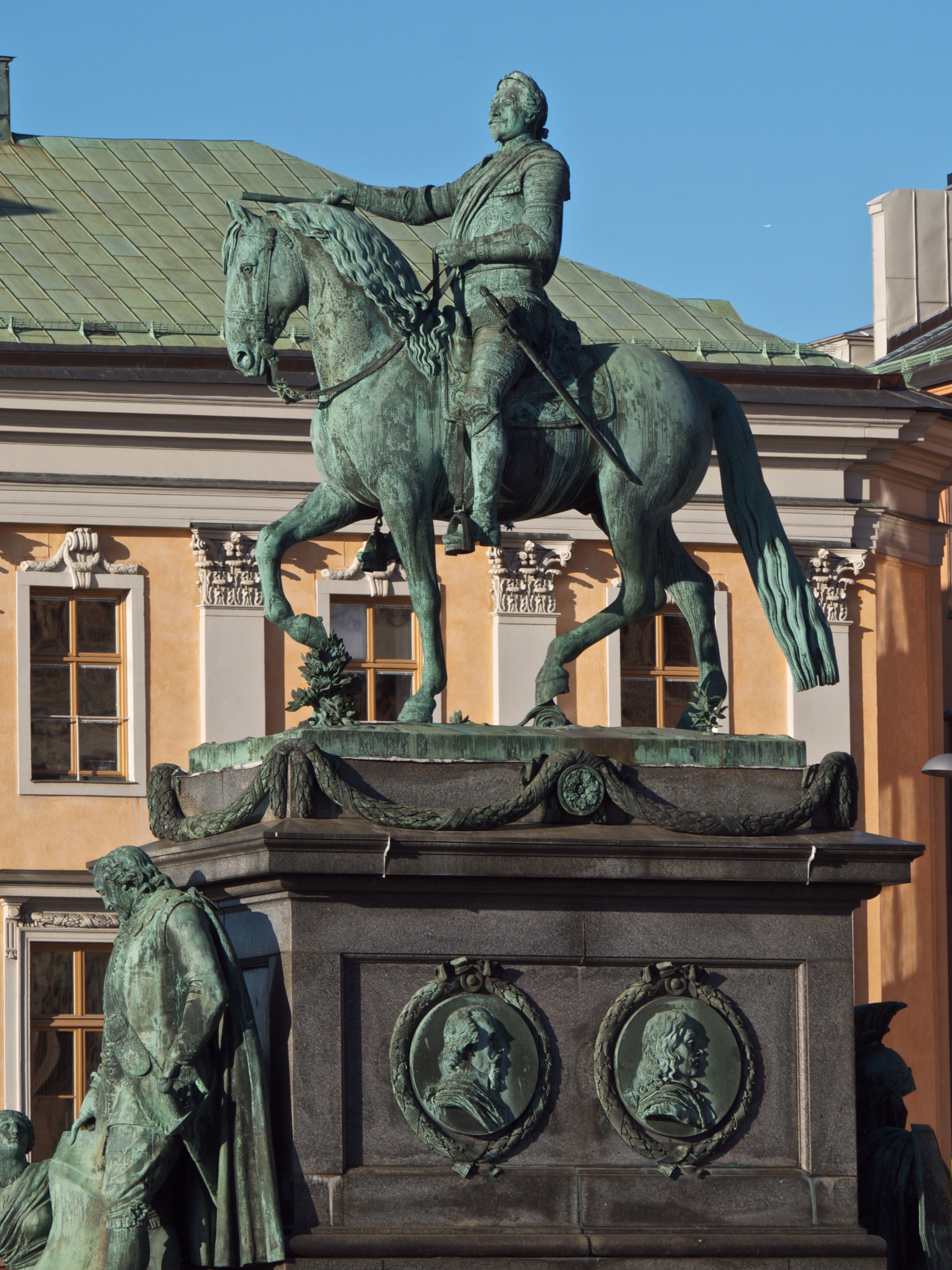
Equestrian monument of Gustav II Adolf, cast by Gerhardt VI Meyer, Stockholm 1779. Stockholm, Gustav Adolfs torg

He also cast in lead the medallions and trophies of the West and South façades of the Royal Castle, and, in Riddarholmen Church, the pulpit and parts of the decorations of the Royal Burial Chapel.

He was innovative in techniques of casting guns and in developing fire hoses. He opened further workshops in Akers and Stafsjö. In 1756 Gerhardt (VI) sold the family foundry to the crown, remaining its director until his retirement in 1772. He became a member of the Royal Academy of Science and was raised to the peerage in 1775.

==== Gerhardt (VII) ====
Gerhardt (VII) lived from 1728 until 1797; he was a son of Gerhardt (VI). In 1772 he followed his father in the position of a Royal cannon caster, but also bells made by him are known. In 1794 the crown ordered the closing of the foundry because of their outdated equipment, and its relocation to Marieberg. With Gerhardt's death in 1797, over six generations and more than 200 years of activity of the Meyer dynasty of bronze casters ended.

== Selection of bells, cannons and other objects cast by members of the Meyer family ==
Rigan Branch
Object	Name of the caster	Year of production	Inscription	Actual or former location	Printed and archival sources
Cannon	Johann I	after 1583	m. hans meier	Formerly? St. Petersburg, Military Historical Museum of Artillery, Engineers and Signal Corps	N. E. Brandenburg 1889, Cat. Nr. 53 Dedicated to Jan Zamoyski (1542-1605), counsellor to Stephan Bátory.
Bell	Johann I	1585	"…IN GOTTES NAMEN HAT MICH HANS MEYER GEGOSSEN, DAS HAT MANIGEN VERDROSEN. ANO 85"	Formerly Riga, St. Peter's church [Petrikirche], loss of war 1915	P. Campe 1930, p. 88 Nr. 48.
Cannon (21-pounder) "Mars"	Johann I	1586	MARS*KINDER*SIN*KURTZ VND*BEHEND*IHR*ANSLACH IS* THO*DEM*KRIGE*GEWEIHT/ IN*GOTTES*NAMEN*BIN*ICH GEFLOSSEN*HANS*MEIER*HAT MICH*GOSSEN*1586	Since 1837 St. Petersburg, Military-Historical Museum of Artillery, Engineers and Signal Corps Formerly Riga, "Scheerbastion"	J. C. Brotze 8; N. E. Brandenburg 1889, Cat. Nr. 50, cf. A.A. 1838a.
Bell	Johann I	1586	"…ANN 1586 DIE 23 MESIS IVLI GOS MICH HANS MEIER"	Umurga (LV) [Ubbenorm]	P. Campe 1930, p. 89 Nr. 49.
37-pounder "Samson der Starke"	Johann I or Hans Skotte	1587	SAMPSON DE STARCKE BIN ICK GYNANT DEN HERRN THO RIGE SI ICK WOL VORWANDT/ ALLE GODTLOSEN SCHOLEN WIKEN VAN MI EDER ICK WIL SE THORITEN WAT AKKE ERERSI... verbum domini manet in eternum	St. Petersburg, Military Historical Museum of Artillery, Engineers and Signal Corps, Formerly Riga, fortress.	N. E. Brandenburg 1889, Cat. 54; Cf. M. Thiel 1827 and A. Anteins 1988, p. 75.
Cannon "Johannes"	Johann I	1600	"JOHANNES IST DER VIERD UND LEZT, WIDER DIE KETZER THUT DAS BEST, DEM ADLER GLEICH FLEUCH ICH GAR SNEL, BESCHIRM MIT GODT STADT MAUR UND WAELL. GOS MICH HANS MEIER ZU RIGA 1600"	Riga, Museum of History and Navigation, Cloister, Nr. 24	P. Campe 1930, p. 33; Dommuseum Riga 1911, p. 63.
Cannon (12-pounder) "Saturnus"	Johann I	1600	SATVURNUS*HEIS*ICH*DIE KINDER*BEIS*ICH*DIE FESTVUNG*STURM*ICH MEIN*NEST*VORBIT*ICH GOS*MICH*HANS*MEYER ZU RIGA*1*6*0*0	Riga, Museum of History and Navigation, cloister, Nr. 35. Formerly St. Petersburg, Military Historical Museum of Artillery, Engineers and Signal Corps. Formerly Riga, "Scheerbastion"	J. C. Brotze p. 7; N. E. Brandenburg 1889, Cat. Nr. 52, A.A. 1838b.
Cannon (23-pounder) "Mercur"	Johann I	1601	MERCURII DER KAUFLEUT GOTT VNDT DAN DER GOTTER SNELLER BOTT DEN NAMEN ICH HAB VND THUE HARTT SHIESSEN DARZV HANS MEIER MICH THET GIESSEN ANNO MDCI	Riga, Museum of History and Navigation, cloister, Nr. 9b (12). Formerly St. Petersburg, Military Historical Museum of Artillery, Engineers and Signal Corps. Formerly Riga, "Sandbastion"	J. C. Brotze p. 15; N. E. Brandenburg 1889, Cat. Nr. 55; A.A. 1838b.
Bell	Johann I	1605	"…Matthies am XXII. Gos mich Hans Meier zv Riga anno 1605" [=21.9.1605]	Jelgava (LV) [Mitau], St. Ann's church [Annenkirche]	P. Campe 1930 p. 96 Nr. 74.
Bell	Johann I	1606	“…gos mich Hans Meier zu Riga 1606”	Bauska (LV) [Bauske]	P. Campe 1930, p. 96 Nr. 75
Bell	Johann I	1607	“mich goss Hans Meier Riga 1607”	Sloka (LV) [Schlock]	P. Campe 1930, p. 96 Nr. 76.
Cannon (4-pounder) „Kranich“	Johann I	1609	DER WACHTENDE KRANICH BIN ICH GEHEISEN HALTE MEINE WACHT SVUNDER VORDRIESEN ALBRECHT BETKEN DER ALTE IN SEINER LETZ HADT MICH GESETZ AVF DER NEWPFORTEN ALHIR ZVM SCHILTWECHTER VORERET VUNDT BESTELT ZV VORTETIGEN DANIT STADT VNDT VELT ANO 1606 DEN 21 MERTZ SEIN LEBENT GESLOSSEN ANO 1609 DEN 26 IVLY HADT MICH HANS MEIER GEGOSSEN ZV RIGA	St. Petersburg, Military Historical Museum of Artillery, Engineers and Signal Corps Formerly Riga, Arsenal	J. C. Brotze; N. E. Brandenburg 1889, Cat. Nr. 56; A. Anteins 1988, p. 71; For the transcription cf. Rigaische Stadtblätter 1827, p. 415, and A.A. 1838b. Donated by Albrecht Betken and Anna vom Damme.
Bell	Georg	1626	„von Meyer in Riga gegossen“	Tallinn (EE), St. Olai church	H. W. J. Rickers 1820, p. 17 and A.A. 1836, p. 456. Donated by Jacob de la Gardie.
Cannon	Georg	1627	MIT GOTTES HILF GOSS MICH GORGEN MEIER ZV RIGA ANNO 1627	(Formerly?) St. Petersburg, Military Historical Museum of Artillery, Engineers and Signal Corps	N. E. Brandenburg 1889, Cat. Nr. 58.
Bell	Georg	1641	WAN D´UHR NICHT NACH DER SONNEN GANG ALL STUNDEN RECHT GIEBT IHREN KLANG+ DIE GANTZE STATT NICHT OHN VERDRUS NACH EINEM NARREN SICH RICHTEN MUSS+ MIDT GOTTES HILF GOSS MICH GORGEN MEYER ZV RIGA ANNO MDCXLI	Formerly Riga, St. Peter's church [Petrikirche], loss of war 1941	P. Campe 1930, 100 Nr. 98; P. Arends 1944, p. 50; J. K. Broce 1776–1818, p. 67; Rigasche Stadtblätter 1825, Nr. 28.
Cannon	Georg	1650	LAS ANDERE BAVWEN AUVFF WAFFEN VND WEHR/ GOTT WOLLEN WIR TRAVWEN SO SIEGEN WIR MEHR/ MIT GOTTES HILF GOS MICH GEORGEN MEYER ZV RIGA 1650	St. Petersburg, Military Historical Museum of Artillery, Engineers and Signal Corps	N. E. Brandenburg 1889, Cat. Nr. 59.
Bells	Gerhardt III	1670-71		Tallinn (EE), St. Olai church	DSHI 100 Campe 028,1; Cf. G. Jensch 1930, p. 166, note 189.
Cannon	Gerhardt III	1672	ANNO 1672	Riga, Museum of the History of Riga and Navigation, cloister, Nr. 18	A. Anteins 1988, p. 72.
Cannon	Gerhardt III	1672	ME FECIT GERHARD MEYER IN RIGA ANNO 1672	Riga, National History Museum of Latvia Formerly St. Petersburg, Military Historical Museum of Artillery, Engineers and Signal Corps	N. E. Brandenburg 1889, Cat. Nr. 63; A. Anteins 1988, p. 72.
Bell	Gerhardt III	1673	Soli Deo Gloria Riga anno 1673 Gerh. Meyer	Jaunpils (LV) [Neuenburg]	P. Campe 1930, p. 108 Nr. 144.
Bell	Gerhardt III	1673	Me fecit Gerhardt Meyer Riga 1673	Ädazi (LV) [Neuermühlen]	P. Campe 1930, p. 108 Nr. 145.
Bell	Gerhardt III	1673	Soli Deo Gloria Gerhardt Meyer in Riga 1673 me fecit	Zemite (LV) [Samiten]	P. Campe 1930, p. 108 Nr. 146.
Cannon (12-pounder)	Gerhardt III	1675	DURCH DAS FEIWER BIN ICH/ GEFLOSSEN GERHARDT MEYER/ IN RIGA HAT MICH GEGOSSEN/ ANNO 1675	Riga, Museum of the History of Riga and Navigation, cloister, Nr. 20 Formerly St. Petersburg, Military Historical Museum of Artillery, Engineers and Signal Corps	N. E. Brandenburg 1889, Cat. Nr. 65; Cf. A.A. 1838b; A. Anteins 1988, p. 72.
Mortar	Gerhardt III	1675	DURCH DAS FEIWER BIN/ ICH GEFLOSSEN GERHART/ MEYER IN RIGA HAT MICH/ GEGOSSEN ANNO 1675	Formerly (?) St. Petersburg, Military Historical Museum of Artillery, Engineers and Signal Corps	N. E. Brandenburg 1889, Cat. Nr. 80.
Cannon	Gerhardt III	1675	ME FECIT GER/HART MEYER/IN RIGA ANNO/1675	Formerly (?) St. Petersburg, Military Historical Museum of Artillery, Engineers and Signal Corps	N. E. Brandenburg 1889, Cat. Nr. 64.
Bell	Gerhardt III	1675	ME FECIT GERHARD MEYER IN RIGA. 1675	Araizi (LV) [Arrasch]	P. Campe 1930, p. 108, Nr. 147; J. K. Broce 1776–1818, p. 70.
Bell	Gerhardt III	1675	GEDEIEN GAB DAS HÖCHSTE GUTH. DURCH KÜNSTLERS HAND UND FEUERS GLUTH. BIN ICH ZU DER GESTALT GERATEN. UND PREISE GOTTES WUNDERTATEN. GERHARDT MEYER ME FECIT RIGA	Riga, Cathedral	P. Campe 1930, p. 108 Nr. 149.
Bell	Gerhardt III	between 1675 and 1686	“Me Fecit Gerhard Meyer in Riga Anno 16”	Riga, St. Jacob's church	P. Campe 1930, p. 108 Nr. 150.
Mortar	Gerhardt III	1676	GERHARD MEYER ME FECIT RIGAE ANNO 1676	Riga, Museum of the History of Riga and Navigation, cloister, Nr. 33 (38)	J. C. Brotze Nr. 16 cited after DSHI 100 Campe 028,1; A. Anteins 1988, p. 72.
Cannon	Gerhardt III	1676	ME FECIT GERHARDT/MEYER IN RIGA/ANNO 1676	Formerly (?) St. Petersburg, Military Historical Museum of Artillery, Engineers and Signal Corps	N. E. Brandenburg 1889, Cat. Nr. 66.
Mortar	Gerhardt III	1676	ME FECIT GERHARDT/MEYER IN RIGA/ANNO 1676	Formerly (?) St. Petersburg, Military Historical Museum of Artillery, Engineers and Signal Corps	N. E. Brandenburg 1889, Cat. Nr. 81.
Bell	Gerhardt III	between 1677 and 1680	“St. Paulus, Gerhardt Meyer Riga”	unknown	P. Campe 1930, p. 110, Nr. 153.
Bell	Gerhardt III	between 1677 and 1680	“St. Matthie, Gerhard Meyer Riga”	unknown	P. Campe 1930, p. 110, Nr. 154.
Bell	Gerhardt III	between 1677 and 1680	“Gerhardt Meyer in Riga”	unknown	P. Campe 1930, p. 110, Nr. 155.
Bell	Gerhardt III	1678	Salvator Mundi.....Durchs Feuer bin ich geflossen [Gerhardt] Meyer hat mich gegossen	Formerly Riga, St. Peter's church [Petrikirche], lost in the fire of 1721	P. Campe 1930, p. 110, Nr. 156.
Bell	Gerhardt III	1680	“Me fecit Gerhardt Meyer in Riga…”	Viesiena (LV) [Weesen]	P. Campe 1930, p. 111, Nr. 160.
Bell	Gerhardt III	1680	“Me fecit Gerhardt Meyer in Riga 1680”	unknown	P. Campe 1930, p. 112, Nr. 162.
Bell	Gerhardt III	1680	Gerhardt Meyer in Riga	unknown	P. Campe 1930, p. 112, Nr. 163.
Bell	Gerhardt III	1681	“…Me fecit Gerhardt Meyer in Riga anno 1681”	Irbe (LV) [Irben]	P. Campe 1930, p. 112, Nr. 166.
Cannon	Gerhardt III	1681	ME FECIT GER/HARDT MEYER/IN RIGA ANNO/1681	Formerly (?) St. Petersburg, Military Historical Museum of Artillery, Engineers and Signal Corps	N. E. Brandenburg 1889, Cat. Nr. 67.
Bell	Gerhardt III	1682	“ME FECIT GERHARD MEYER IN RIGA ANNO 1682…”	Araizi (LV) [Arrasch]	P. Campe 1930, p. 112, Nr. 168.
Bell	Gerhardt III	1683	“…Me fecit Gerhardt Meyer in Riga”	Jaunsubatha (LV) [Neu-Subbath]	P. Campe 1930, p. 114, Nr. 169.
Bell	Gerhardt III	1683	“…Me fecit Gerhardt Meyer Rigae Anno 1683”	Skaistkaine (LV) [Schönberg]	P. Campe 1930, p. 114, Nr. 170.
Bell	Gerhardt III	1683	“Me fecit Gerhardt Meyer in Riga 1683…”	Livberze (LV) [Liven-Bersen]	P. Campe 1930, p. 114, Nr. 171.
Bell	Gerhardt III	1684	“Me fecit Gerhardt Meyer in Riga”	Lielstraupe (LV) [Gross-Roop]	P. Campe 1930, p. 114, Nr. 173.
Bell	Gerhardt III	1686	“…Me fecit Gerhardt Meyer in Riga Anno 1686”	Ile (LV) [Ihlen]	P. Campe 1930, p. 115, Nr. 180.
Bell	Gerhardt III	1687	A: 1687 ME FECIT GERHARD MEYER IN RIGA	unknown	J. K. Broce 1776–1818, I, p. 70.
Cannon (45-pounder) “Rigasche Löwe”	Gerhardt III	1687	IN/ TANTAM MOLEM/ FORMATUM IN FORME/ METALLUM/NOMEN RIGENSIS/ JURE LEONIS HABET/ PRO RIGA RUGIAT FUN/DATQUE HOSTILIA/ CASTRA/ PATRIBUS ET PATRI/AE SYMPATRIOTA VOVET/ GERHARDT MEYER/ ME FECIT/ RIGAE /ANNO 1687.	St. Petersburg, Military Historical Museum of Artillery, Engineers and Signal Corps Formerly Riga, Sandbastion	N. E. Brandenburg 1889, Cat. Nr. 68; A. Anteins 1988, p. 72; Cf. J. C. Brotze Nr. 14 cited after DSHI 100 Campe 028,1 and W. Baum 1910.
Bell	Gerhardt III	1687	“…Anno Christi MDCLXXXIIIX Gloria in excelsis Deo me fundebat Gerhard Meyer in Riga”	Berzaune (LV) [Bersohn]	P. Campe 1930, p. 116, Nr. 184.
12-pounder	Gerhardt III	1688	SO.WIR.GOTT.BEHERTZ VETRAUEN. FEST BLITZEND.KAMPFEN WIR.AUFS.ALLERBEST ME FECIT GERHARD MEYER. IN. RIGA.ANNO 1688	Riga, Museum of the History of Riga and Navigation, cloister, Nr. 25 Formerly St. Petersburg, Military Historical Museum of Artillery, Engineers and Signal Corps Formerly Riga, town bastions	N. E. Brandenburg 1889, Cat. Nr. 69; Cf.. A.A. 1838b; J. C. Brotze Nr. 5 cited after DSHI 100 Campe 028,1.
Mortar	Gerhardt III	1690	ME FECIT GERHARDT/ MEYER IN RIGA/ANNO 1690	St. Petersburg, Military Historical Museum of Artillery, Engineers and Signal Corps	N. E. Brandenburg 1889, Cat. Nr. 92; A. Anteins 1988, p. 72.
Bell	Gerhardt III	1690	“…fecit Gerhard Meyer in Riga 1690”	Penkule (LV) [Pankelhof]	P. Campe 1930, p. 116, Nr. 186.
Bell	Gerhardt III	1690	“…fecit Gerhard Meyer 1690”	Penkule (LV) [Pankelhof]	P. Campe 1930, p. 116, Nr. 187.
Bell	Gerhardt III	1690	“Omnia ad maiorem Dei gloriam B.M.Vir. Honorem Gerhardt Meyer Rigae anno 1690”	Skaistkaine (LV) [Schönberg]	P. Campe 1930, p. 116, Nr. 189.
Bell	Gerhardt III	1691		Ikšķile (LV) [Uxküll]	DSHI 100 Campe 028,1.
Mortar	Gerhardt III	1692	ME FECIT GER/HARD MEYER IN/RIGA ANNO 1692	Riga, Museum of the History of Riga and Navigation, cloister, Nr. 32 (37) Formerly St. Petersburg, Military Historical Museum of Artillery, Engineers and Signal Corps	N. E. Brandenburg 1889, Cat. Nr. 83.
Two hauwitzers	Gerhardt III	1692	ME FECIT GERHARD MEYER IN RIGA ANNO 1692	St. Petersburg, Military Historical Museum of Artillery, Engineers and Signal Corps Formerly Riga, Arsenal	J. C. Brotze Nr. 25, 26 cited after DSHI 100 Campe 028,1; N. E. Brandenburg 1889, Cat. Nr. 86; Cf. A. Anteins 1988, p. 72.
Bell	Gerhardt III	1692	“…ME FECIT GER [hardt Meyer] IN RIGA 1692”	Kuldiga (LV) [Goldingen], St. Catherin's church [Katharinenkirche]	P. Campe 1930, p. 117, Nr. 190.
Bell	Gerhardt III	1693	Gerhardt Meyer	Riga, St. John's church [Johanniskirche] (loss of war 1915)	P. Campe 1930, p. 117, Nr. 191.
Bell	Gerhardt III	1694	“…Me fecit Gerhard Meyer in Riga den 4. April”	Grieze (LV) [Grösen]	P. Campe 1930, p. 117, Nr. 194.
Bell	Gerhardt III	1695	ICH BIN ZU GOTTES I IN DIESE FORM GEBRACHT ICH REGE WENN ICH SCHLAG DIE OHREN UND DIE HERTZEN WIE STETS BEI MEINEM KLANG SEIN END MIT FLEISS BETRACHT WIRD SEINER SEELEN HEIL UND WOLFAHRT NICHT VERSCHERZEN ME FECIT GERHARDUS MEYER IN RIGA ANNO 1695	Riga, St. Peter's church [Petrikriche], (lost in the fire of 1721)	P. Campe 1930, p. 117, Nr. 195; J. K. Broce 1776–1818, I, 68b.
3-pounder	Gerhardt III	1695	ME FECIT GERHARD MEYER IN RIGA ANNO 1695	Formerly (?) St. Petersburg, Military Historical Museum of Artillery, Engineers and Signal Corps Formerly Riga, arsenal	J. C. Brotze Nr. 24 cited after DSHI 100 Campe 028,1; N. E. Brandenburg 1889, Cat. Nr. 70.
Cannon or mortar	Gerhardt III	1696	GERHARDT MEYER/ME FECIT RIGAE/ANNO 1696	Formerly (?) St. Petersburg, Military Historical Museum of Artillery, Engineers and Signal Corps	N. E. Brandenburg 1889, Cat. Nr. 71.
Bell	Gerhardt III	1696	“…DURCH DAS FEWR BIN ICH GEFLOSSEN/ GERHARD MEYER AVS RIGA HAT MICH IN MYTAV GEGOSSEN”	Jelgava (LV) [Mitau], St. Trinitatis	J. Döring 1868; P. Campe 1930, p. 118, Nr. 200.
Bell	Gerhardt III	1698	“Omnia ad Maiorem Dei Gloriam BM. Vir Honorem Anno 1698 Gerhard Meyer me fecit Riga”	unknown	P. Campe 1930, p. 120, Nr. 204.
Bell	Gerhardt III	1698	“Omnia ad maiorem Dei Gloria B. M. Vir Honorem anno 1698 Gerhardt Meyer me fecit Rigae”	Skaistkaine (LV) [Schönberg]	P. Campe 1930, p. 120, Nr. 204.
Bell	Gerhardt III	1699	“…Gerhard Mever me fecit Riga anno 1699”	Grieze (LV) [Grösen]	P. Campe 1930, p. 120, Nr. 209.
Bell	Gerhardt III	1700	“…Gerhard Meyer me fecit Riga anno 1700”	unknown	P. Campe 1930, p. 121, Nr. 214.

Danish Branch
Object	Name of the caster	Year of production	Inscription	Actual or former location	Printed and archival sources
Bell	Johann II	1639	"AVS DEM FEVER BIN ICH GEFLOSSEN, M. HANS MEYER IHR KÖNIGL. MAJESTÄT STÜCK- UND KLOCKEN GIESER IHM HELSINGØR HAT MICH GEGOSSEN ANNO 1639. SOLI DEO GLORIA IN EXCELSIS DEO..."	Kronborg, Slotskirke	L. Hvass, T. Bill-Jessen 2011, p. 181.
Twelve bells	Johann II	1639		unknown	Ordered for Glückstadt. L. Hvass, T. Bill-Jessen 2011, p. 182.
Bell	Johann II	1641	SOLI DEO GLORIA IN EXCELCIS DEO. AUS DEM FEUER BIN ICH GEFLOSSEN HANS MEYR IN HELSINGÖER HAT MICH GEGOS SEN. ANNO 1641	Annisse (Holbo Herred) (DK)	E. Gribsø 1934, p. 62.
Bell	Johann II	1641	SOLI DEO GLORIA DEO IN EXCELSIS. ME FECIT HANS MEYER IN HELSINGØR AO. 1641	Ølstykke (Ølstykke Herred) (DK)	E. Gribsø 1934, p. 111.
Bell	Johann II	1644	ANNO 1644 ER DENNE KLOCKE BEKOSTET TIL GRAESE KIRCKE YNDER VOR NÅDIGSTE KONNIG CHRISTIAN: DEN 4. WELB. HANS VLDERICH GYLDENLOVE SLODT H. OFFVER KRONBORG OC FRIDERICHSB H. SØFREN: OLVFSØN SOGNEP. TIL GRAESE OC SIERSLØF. MADTS LAVRITZØN KIRCKE VERGE. AVS DEN FEYIER BIN ICH GEFLOSEN M. HANS MEYER IN HELSCHENOR HAT MICH GEGOSSEN. SOLI DEO GLORIA IN EXCELCIS DEO	Græse (Lynge-Frederiksborg Herred) (DK)	E. Gribsø 1934, p. 75.
Bell	Johann II	1644	ANNO 1644 SUBIMPERIO REGIS CLEMENTISSIMI CHRISTIANI 4, PRÆSIDE REGIO IOHANNE ULDRICH GYLDENLØVE, PASTORE PETRO JACOBI BIRCH HÆC CAMPANA SUMPTIBUS ECCLESIÆ UGGELØSE FUSA TUTORE WILL- HELMO ANDREÆ SOLI DEO GLORIA IN EXCELSIS DEO. AUS DEN FEYER BIN ICH GEFLOSSEN. M. HANS MEYER IN HELSCHENØR HAT MICH GEGOSSEN	Uggeløse (Lynge-Frederiksborg Herred) (DK)	E. Gribsø 1934, p. 105.
Bell	Johann II	1647		Sel (NF)	H. Fett 1911, p. 137.
Bell	Johann II	1649	ANNO CHRISTI MDCXLIX HELSINGORAE ME FECIT M. LOHANNES MEYER SVB CASTELLANO CORONEBVRGENSI GENEROSO ET NOBILI D(OMI)NO ARNOLDO DE CVLA ECCLESIAE A HVIVS SEEBVRGENSIS PASTORE D(OMI)NO LOANNE IOANNIS A ALBVRGIO PROCVRATORIBVSQ(UE) IOANNE LAV- RENTIO ET ANDREA ERASMI. LEVIT. 20: CVSTO DITE SABBATHA MEA ET PAVETE AD SANCTVA RIVM MEVM EGODOMINVS.	Søborg (Holbo Herred) (DK)	E. Gribsø 1934, p. 102.
Bell	Johann II	1649	SOLI DEO GLORIA IN EXCELSIS DEO BVCCINA DVM VOCAT HÆC CHRISTI GENVS ECCE SONORAM VERBI QVÆRE TVBAM CÆLI QVIA LIMINA PAN DIT. OTTO POVISCH PREECES FRIDERICIBURG FRANTZ LAVRITZØN SOGNEPREST, OLVF LAVRITZØN KIRCHEVERRIE. AVS DEN FEYIER BIN ICH GEFLOSEN HANNS MEYER HAT MICH GEGOSSEN ANNO 1649	Kregme (Strø Herred) (DK)	E. Gribsø 1934, p. 85.
Bell	Johann II	1650	SOLI DEO GLORIA IN EXCELSIS. PATRONO DNO POVISCH, PASTORE DNO NICOLAO FRANCISCI, TUTORE ANDREA CHRISTIERNI, CONFEC- TUM SONUM HUNC EDO — FESTINATE CITO, CUM PULSOR, TUBA DEI SUM, QVÆRITE MORTALES REGNA BEATA DEI. ME FECIT HANS MEYER 1650	Strø (Strø Herred) (DK)	E. Gribsø 1934, p. 101.
Bell	Johann II	1652	ANTE MEVM TEMPVS NVMERABITIS HYBLAS MILLE ET SEX- CENTAS CVM QVINQVAGINTA DVABVS. ME FECIT HANNS MEYER 1652	Lille Lyngby (Strø Herred) (DK)	E. Gribsø 1934, p. 88.
Bell	Johann II			Esbønderup	L. Hvass, T. Bill-Jessen 2011 p. 183.
Bell	Johann II	1654	ME FECIT HANS MEYER ANNO 1654	Hofterups kyrka, Skåne (SE)	
Bell	Johann II	1656	GUDS ORD ER SANNING TIL EVIG TID	Birketveit, Iveland (NF)	
Bell	Johann II	1660		Høivaag (NF)	H. Fett 1911, p. 137.
Bell	Johann II	1658	SOLI DEO GLORIA IN EXCELSIS DEO. OTTO POWISCH, SLODTZHERRE PAA FREDERICHBORG. ME FECIT HANS MEYER ANNO 1658	Hillerød (DK)	E. Gribsø 1934, p. 82.
Bell	Johann II	1663		Strandebarm (NF)	H. Fett 1911, p. 137.
Bell	Johann II	1664	HØR IEG KALDER DIG TILL GUD KOM OC HØR HANS HEL LIGE BUD HENRICH TOMASØN SOGNEPRÆST OC KIRCKEWERGER 1664 SOLI DEO GLORIA IN EXSELSIS DEO. ME FECIT HANS MEYER ANNO 1664.	Birkerød (DK)	E. Gribsø 1934, p. 63.
Bell	Johann II	1664	SOLI DEO GLORIA IN EXCELSIS DEO, MOVEO MOVEOR IN CIEI (DVS. DEI) GLORIAM NICOLAUS JOHANNI[S] BANG ECCLESIÆ PASTOR AO 1664 KIRKEVÆRGE DITLØW FROM GOS MICH HANS MEYER 1664	Slagslunde (Ølstykke Herred) (DK)	E. Gribsø 1934, p. 98.

Stockholm Branch
Object	Name of the caster	Year of production	Inscription	Actual or former location	Printed and archival sources
Paschal candelabrum	Gerhardt I	1596	ANNO 1596	Riga, St. Peter's church [Petrikirche]	C. Mettig, F. Moll 1892, p. 23.
Bathing Venus for Giambologna	Gerhardt I	1597	ME FECIT GERHARDT MEYER HOLMIAE ANNO 1597/ Den 25. November	Private Collection	A. Rudigier, B. Truyols (2016).
Bells for Riga	Gerhardt II	1638			DSHI 100 Campe 028,1.
Brass chandeliers	Gerhardt II	1643		Stockholm, Jakobs Kyrka	Jakobs Kyrka 1930–34, p. 350.
Chandelier	Gerhardt II	1644		Stockholm, Jakobs Kyrka	Stockholms Kyrkor IV 1930–34, p. 350.
Bell	Gerhardt II	1644		Stockholm, Jakobs Kyrka	Stockholms Kyrkor IV 1930–34, p. 419.
Bell	Gerhardt II	1647	ME FECIT GERDT MEYER SUM /---/ 1647	Spånga kyrka, Uppland (SE)	
Bell	Gerhardt II	1647	DORCH GOTTES HYLF GUS MICH GERDT MEYER IN STOCKHOLM ANNO 1647	Frösunda kyrka, Uppland (SE)	
Kopparmatte	Gerhardt II	1647/49		Stockholm, Stadsmuseum Formerly Stockholm, Stortorget	SSA, Byggnadskollegiet protokoll 23/3, 5/4 1647, juni 1649; Cf. G. Axel-Nilsson 1943.
Bell	Gerhardt II	1651		Stockholm, Jakobs Kryka (recast)	RA, Riksregistratur 1648, 26.4.; Jakobs Kyrka 1930–34, p. 419.
Bell	Gerhardt II	1651	HOLMIAE ME FUNDEBAT GERDT MEYER 1651	Bromma kyrka, Uppland (SE)	
Bell	Gerhardt II	1653	HOLMIAE SUECORUM ME FUNDEBAT GERDT MEYER ANNO 1653	Järfälla kyrka, Uppland (SE)	
Bell	Gerhardt II	1654	HOLMIAE SVECORUM ME FUNDEBAT GERDT MEYER 1654	Sorunda kyrka, Södermanland (SE)	
Bell	Johann IV	1663	...Holmiæ me fundebat Iohan(nes) Meyer	Ristiina (FI)	R. Pitkäranta 2004, p. 450.
Cannon	Johann IV	1665	GOS MICH IOHAN MEYER IN STOCKHOLM ANNO 1665	Stockholm, Armémuseum, AM 49109	
Bell	Johann IV	1666	Gloria in excelsis deo et in terra pax. Laudate in cymbalis. Me fundebat Johan Meyer anno 1666	Pskov (RU), Spaso-Mirozskijklostret	T. A. J. Arne 1917, p. 99.
Bell	Johann IV	1671	Gloria Soli Deo/ Maria Sophia de la Gardie/ Johann Meyer Anno 1671 Holmiae me fundebat	Ivangorod (RU)	T. A. J. Arne 1917, p. 99.
Bell	Johann IV	1673	Soli Deo Gloria/Holmiae Johan Meyer anno 1673	Anttola (FI)	R. Pitkäranta 2004, p. 9.
Bell	Johann IV	1673	...[I]ohan(nes) Meyer anno 1673	Porvoo (FI), Tuomiokirkki	R. Pitkäranta 2004, p. 409.
Bell	Johann IV	1674	Me fundebat Johan Meyer anno 1674 Holmiæ	Kokemäki (FI)	R. Pitkäranta 2004, p. 202.
Cannon	Johann IV	1675	HOLMIAE ME FVNDERAT IOHAN MEYER ANNO 1675	Stockholm, Armémuseum, AM 049709	
Bell	Johann IV	1675	...Holmiæ me funde[bat] Iohan(nes) Meyer anno 1675	Pernaja (FI)	R. Pitkäranta 2004, p. 385.
Naval Bell	Johann IV	1677	ANNO 1677...ADMIRALITET.......IOHAN MEYER HOLMIAE	Stockholm, Nationalmuseum	
Bell	Johann IV	1677	Gloria in excelsis Deo et in terra pax(Anno 1677/ Me fundebat Iohan(nes) Meyer	Taivassalo (FI)	R. Pitkäranta 2004, p. 494.
Bell	Johann IV	1680	Anno 1680/Soli Deo Gloria/Gloria in excelsis Deo/Holmiæ me fundebat Iohan Meyer	Tervola (FI), Uusi Kirkko	R. Pitkäranta 2004, p. 518.
Bell	Gerhardt IV	1692		Vika kyrka (SE)	
Bell	Gerhardt IV	1695	ME FECIT HOLMIAE GERHARDT MEYER 1695“	Angermünde (GE)	R. Dethlefsen 1919; H.-G. Eichler 2003, p. 195.
Bell	Gerhardt IV	1696	DIESE GLOCKE HABEN SEINE KÜNINGLICHE MAISTAT DER / GROSSMACHTIGSE KÖNIG CARL XI. DIESER CARLSKIRCHE / ALHIR IN REVAL AVF SANCT ANTONIBERG ANSTAT DERIENI / GEN WELCHE VON DAR ZVM SCHLOSVHRWERCK GENOMEN /WORDEN ALLERGNADIGST VEREHRET WELCHES GOTT ZV /EHREN VND SEINER KÖNIGLICHEN MAISTAT ZVM CHRISTÖBLICHEN /NACHRVHM DEREN NACHKOMMEN ZVR KÜNFTIGEN NACHRICHT / ALHIR EIGESTOCHEN WORDEN GLORIA IN EXCELSIS DEO ME FECIT HOLMIAE GERHARDT MEYER A 1696 WERBUM DEI MANET IN AETERNAM. GOTTES WORT LUTERI LEHR VERGEHET NVN VND NIMMER MEHR.	Charles' Church (Kaarli kirik), Tallinn, Estonia	
Bell	Gerhardt IV	1698	ME FECIT HOLMIAE GERHARD MEYER ANNO 1698	Spånga kyrka, Uppland (SE)	
Bell	Gerhardt IV	1698	GLORIA IN EXCELSIS DEO ME FECIT HOLMIAE GERHARD MEYER ANNO 1698	Ekerö kyrka, Södermanland (SE)	
Two Bells	Gerhardt IV	1698	...DEO ME FECIT HOLMIAE GERHARD MEYER 1698	Mörbylånga kyrka, Uppland (SE)	
Bell	Gerhardt IV	1698	ANNO DOMINI MDCXCVIII ME FECIT HOLMIAE GERHARDT MEIJER	Stockholm, Riddarholmskyrkan	C. F. Rothlieb 1822, p. 32f.
Bell	Gerhardt IV	1698	Soli Deo Gloria. Anno 1696. Gloria in excelsis Deo. Me fecit Holmiae Gerhardt Meyer	Kuusamo (FI)	R. Pitkäranta 2004, p. 234.
Two Bells	Gerhardt IV	1699	GLORIA...ME FECIT GERHARDT MEYER	Karlskrona (SE), Museum	
Bell	Gerhardt IV	1699		Bladåkers kyrka, Uppland (SE)	
Two Bells	Gerhardt IV	1701	1. ME FECIT HOLMIAE GERHARDT MEYER ANNO 1701; 2. KLÅCKA GUTEN I STOCKHOLM AF GERHARD MEYER 1701	Karlskrona (SE), Amiralitetskyrkan	
Bell	Gerhardt IV	1701	ARTIFICE GERHARD MEYER SUM REFUCA HOLMIAE A:o 1701	Litslena kyrka, Södermanland (SE)	
Bell	Gerhardt IV	1701	Soli Deo Gloria. Me fecit Holmiae Gerhardt Meyer anno 1701	Korpilahti (FI)	R. Pitkäranta 2004, p. 208.
Bell	Gerhardt IV	1703		Närke (SE), Rinkeby kyrka	
Bell	Gerhardt IV	1704		Grovare (Vists), Västergötland (SE)	J. Hedberg 1982, p. 558
Bell	Gerhardt IV	1704	Gloria in excelsis Deo. Me fecit Holmiae Gerhardt [Meyer] anno 1704	Askola (FI)	R. Pitkäranta 2004, p. 12.
Bell	Gerhardt IV	1705	GLORA EXELSIS DEO ME FECIT HOLMIAE GERHARD MEIJER ANNO 1705	Näs, Uppland (SE)	Upplands fornminnesförenings tidskrift VIII, 1879, p. 112.
Bell	Gerhardt IV	1705		Knutby kyrka, Uppland (SE)	
Bell	Gerhardt IV	1705	Anno 1705 me fecit Gerhardt Meijer Holmiae	Utsjoki or Enare, Fl (Lappland)	http://kirjasto.rovaniemi.fi/digi/lappmarken3.htm
Bell	Gerhardt IV	1706	GLORA EXELSIS DEO ME FECIT HOLMIAE GERHARD MEYER ANNO 1706	Husby-Sjuhundra kyrka (SE)	
Bell	Gerhardt IV	1706	Soli de Gloria. Gloria in excelsis Deo. Me fecit Holmiae Gerhardt Meyer anno 1706	Pudasjärvi (FI)	R. Pitkäranta 2004, p. 414.
Bell	Gerhardt IV	1706		Dalarna (SE), Stora Tuna kyrka	
Bell	Gerhardt IV	1706		Närke (SE), Axebergs kyrka	
Triple-barrelled cannon	Gerhardt IV	1708	ME FECIT GERHARDT MEYER HOLMIAE ANNO 1708	Stockholm, Armémuseum, AM 049722	
Triple-barrelled cannon	Gerhardt IV	1708	ME FECIT GERHARDT MEYER HOLMIAE ANNO 1708	Stockholm, Armémuseum, AM 049727	
Bell	Gerhardt IV	1708	ME FECIT GERHARDT MEYER	Uppsala, Hospitalskyrkan	http://www.scribo.se/hospitalskyrkans-klocka
Four bells	Gerhardt IV	1708-10	1. GIUTEN I STOCKHOLM TILL UPSALA DOMKYRCKIA; AF GERHARDT MEYER DEN 13 APRIL ANNO 1708 2. (founded me Gerhard Meyer 1708) 3. REFECTA STOCKHOLMICA PER GERHARD MEYER 4. FECIT HOLMIAE GERHARD MEYER ANNO 1710	Uppsala, Domkyrka	
Bell	Gerhardt VI	1717	ME FECIT HOLMIAE GERHARD MEIJER ANNO 1717	Danderyd, Uppland (SE)	Upplands fornminnesförenings tidskrift IV, 1875, p. 4.
Bell	Gerhardt VI	1719	Salvator mundi. Me fudit Gerh(ardo) Meyer Holmiæ	Vammala (FI), Karkun kirkko	R. Pitkäranta 2004, p. 608.
Bell	Catharina Meyer	1722	...me Catharina Meyer a (nno) MDCCXXII d(i.e.) 9. Maii Holmiae confecit.	Keminmaa (FI), Uusi Kirkko	R. Pitkäranta 2004, p. 181.
Bell	Gerhardt VI	1724	Confecit Holmiæ a(nno) 1724 Gerhardt Meyer.	Kristiinankaupunki (FI)	R. Pitkäranta 2004, p. 216.
Bell	Gerhardt VI	1724	Gloria in altissimus Deo. Me fecit Gerhardt Meyer Holmiæ	Laihia (FI)	R. Pitkäranta 2004, p. 244.
Bell	Gerhardt VI	1724	...a Gerhardo Meyer Holmiæ a(nn)o 1724 est fusum...	Vähäkyrö (FI)	R. Pitkäranta 2004, p. 628.
Pair of garden vases	Gerhardt VI	1725	ME FECIT GERHARDT MEYER/HOLMIAE ANNO 1725	Galerie Kugel, Paris	
Bell	Gerhardt VI	1726		Dalarna (SE), Amsbergs kapell	
Bell	Gerhardt VI	1727		Markims kyrka, Uppland (SE)	
Bell	Gerhardt VI	1727	In usum eccle(siae) Lappaiærvi fusa sum a Gerhardo Meyer fusore regius Holmiæ a(nn)o 1727	Lappajärvi (FI)	R. Pitkäranta 2004, p. 254.
Bell	Gerhardt VI	1729		Närke (SE), Götlunda kyrka	
Bell	Gerhardt VI	1729	Me fecit/Gerh(ard) Meyer Holmiæ	Sievi (FI)	R. Pitkäranta 2004, p. 474.
Bell	Gerhardt VI	1729	...M(e) f(ecit) Gerh(ard) Meyer Holmiæ 1729	Vöyri (FI)	R. Pitkäranta 2004, p. 632.
Bell	Gerhardt VI	1729	...fusa est hæc campana a G(erhardo) Meyer anno æræ Christianæ MDCCXXIX mense Iulio	Ylitornio (FI)	R. Pitkäranta 2004, p. 637.
Bell	Gerhardt VI	1730		Länna kyrka, Uppland (SE)	
Bell	Gerhardt VI	1730	.../A(nno) 1730 s[culpta] a Gerh(ardo) Meyer	Siikajoki (FI)	R. Pitkäranta 2004, p. 475.
Bell	Gerhardt VI	1731	...sculpta a Gerh(ardo) Meyer Holmiæ a(nno) MDCCXXXI	Kokkola (FI)	R. Pitkäranta 2004, p. 205.
Bell	Gerhardt VI	1731	Me fecit (Gerh(ard) Meyer Holmiæ a(nno) 1731	Pornainen (FI)	R. Pitkäranta 2004, p. 403.
Bell	Gerhardt VI	1731	Fridericus I, rex Sueciæ; Ulrica Eleonora reg(ina) Sueciæ/ Me fecit Gerh(ard) Meyer Holmiæ	Vähäkyrö (FI)	R. Pitkäranta 2004, p. 629.
Bell	Gerhardt VI	1732	Me fec(it) Gerh(ard) Meyer Holmiæ	Nummi-Pusula (FI), Pusulan Kirkko	R. Pitkäranta 2004, p. 334.
Bell	Gerhardt VI	1733		Stenkyrka kyrka, Gotland (SE)	
Mortar	Gerhardt VI	1734		Stockholm, Armémuseum, AM 075168	
Mortar	Gerhardt VI	1734	G: Meyer Fec: 1734 Nr. 1	Stockholm, Armémuseum, AM 075169	
Bell	Gerhardt VI	1735		Gotröra kyrka, Uppland (SE)	
Bell	Gerhardt VI	1736	G(erhard) Meyer fecit Holmiæ/a(nno) 1736	Kustavi (FI)	R. Pitkäranta 2004, p. 233.
Bell	Gerhardt VI	1737		Dalarna (SE), Mockfjärds kapell	
Bell	Gerhardt VI	1738	...conflatum est Holmiae anno MDCCXXXVIII a Gerh(ardo) Meyer	IIsalmi (FI)	R. Pitkäranta 2004, p. 130.
Bell	Gerhardt VI	1738	...Me fecit Ger(ard) Meyer Holmiae	Juva (FI)	R. Pitkäranta 2004, p. 160.
Bell	Gerhardt VI	1739		Alsike kyrka, Uppland (SE)	
Bell	Gerhardt VI	1740	Anno MDCCXL...G(erhard) Meyer fudit Holmiæ	Kumlinge (FI)	R. Pitkäranta 2004, p. 227.
Cannon	Gerhardt VI	1741	G. MEYER FECIT – AXELIO LÖWEN-SENATORIAE DIGNITATIS PIGNUS AMORIS-ORDINES SUECIAE- MDCCXLI	Stockholm, Armémuseum, AM 061409	
Cannon	Gerhardt VI	1741	G. MEYER FECIT – AXELIO LÖWEN-SENATORIAE DIGNITATIS PIGNUS AMORIS-ORDINES SUECIAE- MDCCXLI	Stockholm, Armémuseum, AM 061413	
Bell	Gerhardt VI	1741		Orkesta kyrka, Uppland (SE)	
Mortar	Gerhardt VI	1742		Stockholm, Armémuseum, AM 075171	
Cannon	Gerhardt VI	1743	G: MEYER FEC: HOLMIAE. 1743*		Stockholm, Armémuseum, AM 049753
Bell	Gerhardt VI	1744		Medelpad (SE), Städa kyrka	
Bell	Gerhardt VI	1744	G(erhard) Meyer fecit Holmiæ 1744	Salo (FI), Salo-Uskelan kirkko	R. Pitkäranta 2004, p. 462.
Bell	Gerhardt VI	1744		Närke (SE), Tisslinge kyrka	
Bell	Gerhardt VI	1745		Viklau kyrka, Gotland (SE)	
Bell	Gerhardt VI	1745		Kräklinge kyrka, Gotland	
Bell	Gerhardt VI	1745	G(erhard) Meyer fec(it) Holmiæ	Lempäälä (FI)	R. Pitkäranta 2004, p. 264.
Bell	Gerhardt VI	1745	G(erhard) Meyer, fec(it) Holmia MDCCXLV	Sotkamo (FI)	R. Pitkäranta 2004, p. 484.
Bell	Gerhardt VI	1745	.../Fusæ Holmiæ/ a G(erhardo) Meyer/anno 1745	Uusikaarlepyy (FI), Munsalan kirkko	R. Pitkäranta 2004, p. 586.
Bell	Gerhardt VI	1746	Me paucos ante annos ruptam pristinae formae restituit G(erhard) Meyer Holmiae 1746	Houtskär (FI)	R. Pitkäranta 2004, p. 122.
Bell	Gerhardt VI?	n.d.	G(erhard) Meyer fecit Holmiae	Iitti (FI)	R. Pitkäranta 2004, p. 132.
Bell	Gerhardt VI?	n.d.	G(erhard) Meyer fud(it) Holmiæ	Nurmijärvi (FI), Nurmijärven kirkko	R. Pitkäranta 2004, p. 337.
Bell	Gerhardt VI?	n.d.	Me fec(it) G(erhard) Meyer Holmiæ	Siikajoki (FI)	R. Pitkäranta 2004, p. 476.
Bell	Gerhardt VI	1746	[M]e fec(it) G(erhard) Meyer Holmiæ	Kuhmalati (FI)	R. Pitkäranta 2004, p. 224.
Bell	Gerhardt VI	1746	Me fec(it) G(erhard) Meyer Holmiae a(nno) 1746	Hämeenkoski (FI)	R. Pitkäranta 2004, p. 126.
Bell	Gerhardt VI	1746	Me fec(it) G(erhard) Meijer Holmiae 1746	Pedersöre (FI), Ähtävan kirkko	R. Pitkäranta 2004, p. 382.
Bell	Gerhardt VI	1747	Me fec(it) G(erhard) Meyer Holmiæ	Laukaa (FI)	R. Pitkäranta 2004, p. 258.
Bell	Gerhardt VI	1748		Östuna kyrka, Uppland	
Bust of King Charles XII	Gerhardt VI	1748	Gerh. Meijer fudit 1748, Holmiae	Paris, Louvre; Potsdam, Sanssouci; Stockholm, Royal Palace	
Bell	Gerhardt VI	1748/53		Nederluleå kyrka (SE)	
Bell	Gerhardt VI	1749?	Me fec(it) G(erhard) Meyer Holmiæ	Kuusjoki (FI)	R. Pitkäranta 2004, p. 236.
Bell	Gerhardt VI	1749	Alawo. Fusa 1734. Refusa et aucta 1749 a G(erhardo) Meyer Holmiae	Alavus (FI)	R. Pitkäranta 2004, p. 5.
Bell	Gerhardt VI	1749	Gerhard) Meyer fec(it) Holmiæ 1749...	Kemijärvi (FI)	R. Pitkäranta 2004, p. 177.
Bell	Gerhardt VI	1750		Gräsö kyrka, Uppland (SE)	
Model of a gun drill	Gerhardt VI	1750 ca.		Stockholm, Armémuseum, AM 074810	
Bell	Gerhardt VI	1751		Bro Kyrka (SE)	
Bell	Gerhardt VI	1752	SVLENSKA PERLAN AF GERH(ARD) MEYER GUTEN I STOCKHOLM A(NN)O 1752	Liepāja (LV) [Libau], Catholic church	K. M. Kowalski 2005, p. 481.
Bell	Gerhardt VI	1752		Bladåkers kyrka, Uppland (SE)	
Bell	Gerhardt VI	1753	Gerh(ard) Meyer fecit Holmiae	Askola (FI)	R. Pitkäranta 2004, p. 13.
Bell	Gerhardt VI	1753	G(erhard) Meyer fecit Holmiae	Anjalankoski (FI), Sippolan kirkko	R. Pitkäranta 2004, p. 8.
Bell	Gerhardt VI	1753	Ger(hard) Meyer fecit Holmiæ	Ruokolahti (FI)	R. Pitkäranta 2004, p .455.
Naval bell	Gerhardt VI	1753	Guten af G. Meyer, Stockholm	Stockholm, Sjöhistoriska museet, S 6323	https://www.sjohistoriska.se/en/collections/search-the-collections/digitaltmuseum
Bell	Gerhardt VI	1754	GERH(ARD) MEYER FECIT HOLMIAE 1754	Valmiera (LV) [Wolmar], St. Simon's church	K. M. Kowalski 2005, p. 481.
Bell	Gerhardt VI	1755		Halla kyrka, Gotland (SE)	
Bell	Gerhardt VI	1755		Sjonhems kyrka, Gotland (SE)	
Bell	Gerhardt VI	1755	Gerh(ard) Meyer fecit Holmiae	Jokionen (FI)	R. Pitkäranta 2004, p. 154.
Bell	Gerhardt VI	1756	...G(erhard) Meyer fecit Holmiae anno 1756	Isojoki (FI)	R. Pitkäranta 2004, p. 137.
Bell	Gerhardt VI	1757		Osseby-Garns kyrka, Uppland (SE)	
Bell	Gerhardt VI	1757	Gerh(ard) Meyer fecit Holmiæ	Loimaa (FI), Metsämaan kirko	R. Pitkäranta 2004, p. 277.
Bell	Gerhardt VI	1758		Gammelgarns kyrka, Gotland (SE)	
Bell	Gerhardt VI	1758		Ethelhems kyrka, Gotland (SE)	
Bell	Gerhardt VI	1758	GERHARD MEYER FECIT HOLMIAE 1758	Slite kyrka, Gotland (SE)	
Bell	Gerhardt VI	1758		Skederda kyrka (SE)	
Bell	Gerhardt VI	1759		Vidbo kyrka, Uppland (SE)	
Bell	Gerhardt VI	1759	Gerh(ard) Meyer fecit Holmiæ	Lapinjärvi (FI)	R. Pitkäranta 2004, p. 250.
Bell	Gerhardt VI	1759	Gerh(ard) Meyer fecit Holmiæ a(nno) 1759	Taipalsaari (FI)	R. Pitkäranta 2004, p. 492.
Bell	Gerhardt VI	1760		Lagga kyrka, Uppland (SE)	
Bell	Gerhardt VI	1760		Farsta kyrka (SE)	
Bell	Gerhardt VI	1760		Edebacka kyrka, Uppland (SE)	
Bell	Gerhardt VI	1760	G(erhard) Meyer fec(it) Holmiæ	Vampula (FI)	R. Pitkäranta 2004, p. 611.
Bell	Gerhardt VI	1762	...G(erhard) Meyer fecit Holmiæ	Jomala (FI)	R. Pitkäranta 2004, p. 156.
Bell	Gerhardt VI	1763	Campana Helsingf(orsien)sis cum additamento et liberali sumtu mercatoris Ioh(annis) Cederholm recusa Holmiae a G(erardo) Meyer 1763	Helsinki, Tuomiokirkko	R. Pitkäranta 2004, p. 54.
Bell	Gerhardt VI	1764		Kårsta kyrka, Uppland (SE)	
Mortar	Gerhardt VI	1764		Stockholm, Armémuseum, AM 075187	
Bell	Gerhardt VI	1766		Fittja kyrka (SE)	
Bell	Gerhardt VI	1768	...G(erhard) Meyer fud(it) Holm(iae) 1768	Helsinki, Tuomiokirkko	R. Pitkäranta 2004, p. 54.
Bell	Gerhardt VI	1769		Närtuna kyrka, Uppland (SE)	
Bell	Gerhardt VI	1769	.../Fusa Holmiae a G(erhardo) Meyer/1769	Uusikaarlepyy (FI), Uudenkaralrepyyn kirkki	R. Pitkäranta 2004, p. 584
Bell	Gerhardt VI	1770	...denuo sculpta a Gerh(ardo) Meyer a(nno) 1770,...	Rantsila (FI)	R. Pitkäranta 2004, p. 428.
Bell	Gerhardt VI	1771		Hökhuvud kyrka, Uppland (SE)	
Mortar	Gerhardt VII	1771	G. MEYER FUD. HOLMIAE 1771	Madrid, Museo del Ejercito	A. N. Kennard 1986, p. 114.
Bell	Gerhardt VI	1772	...fusa a G(erardo) Meyer Holm(iae) 1772	Heinola (FI) Maaseurakunnan kirkko	R. Pitkäranta 2004, p. 51.
Bell	Gerhardt VII	1783		Visby, Gotland (SE), domkyrka	
Bell	Gerhardt VII	1784		Lunda kyrka, Uppland (SE)	
Bell	Gerhardt VII	1785	GERH(ARDU)S MEYER FECIT HOLMIAE 1785	Liepāja (VL) [Libau], Museum, formerly Imaljen	K. M. Kowalski 2005, p. 482.
Bell	Gerhardt VII	1785	Me fecit G(erhardu)s Meyer	Pihtipudas (FI)	R. Pitkäranta 2004, p. 393.
Bell	Gerhardt VII	1789	Anno 1789 die 5. Septembris sub violenti motu et pulsation dirupta fuis. Mox Holmiam transmissa ibidemque recusa et aucta sum a Gerh(ardo) S. Meyer....	Ilmajoki (FI)	R. Pitkäranta 2004, p. 134.
Mortar	Gerhardt VII	1795	ME FECIT G. MEYER HOLMIAE AR 1795	Stockholm, Armémuseum, AM 061218	
Howitzer	Gerhardt VII	1795	ME FECIT G. MEYER HOLMIAE AR 1795	Stockholm, Armémuseum, AM 061219	

== Archives and Bibliography ==
- J.C. Brotze = Johann Christoph, Livonica. Sammlung verschiedener Liefländischer Monumente, Prospecte, Müntzen, Wapen I-X, Manuscript, Latvijas Universitātes Akadēmiskā bibliotēka, Riga.
- DSHI 100 Campe 28,1 = Bequest Paul Campe (1885–1960), Herder Institute for Historical Research on East Central Europe, Marburg
- KA = Krigsarkivet, Stockholm
- LVVA = Latvijas Valsts vēstures arhīvs, Riga
- RA = Riksarkivet, Stockholm
- SSA = Stockholm Stadsarkiv
- A.A.: "Der Pulver-Thurm", Rigaische Stadt-Blätter XXVIII, 51 (1827), pp. 414–416.
- A.A.: "Die Kirche des heil. Olai in Reval", Das Inland. Eine Wochenschrift für Liv-, Est- und Kurland's Geschichte, Geographie, Statistik und Literatur I, 27 (1836), pp. 450–457.
- A.A.: "Beitrag zu der Kunde der Alterthümer unserer Stadt", Rigaische Stadt-Blätter XXXIX, 23 (1838a), pp. 177–180.
- A.A.: "Beitrag zu der Kunde der Alterthümer unserer Stadt", Rigaische Stadt-Blätter XXXIX, 24 (1838b), pp. 186–191.
- A. Anteins: Bronza Latvijā. Pa metālu ieguves un apstrādes vēstures lappusēm, Riga 1988.
- P. Arends: Die St. Petri-Kirche in Riga, Riga 1944.
- T.A.J. Arne: Det stora Svitjod: essayer om gångna tiders Svensk-ryska kulturförbindelser, Stockholm 1917.
- W. Baum: "Altrigasche Geschütze", Rigasche Zeitung Nr. 250 (1910), p. 1.
- N.E. Brandenburg: Istoricheskīĭ katalog S.-Peterburgskago artillerīĭskago muzei︠a︡ III., Sankt Petersburg 1889.
- J.K. Broce: Zīmējumi un apraksti 2. Rīgas priekšpilsētas un tuvākā apkārtne [Die Vorstädte und die Umgebung Rigas], Zeids, Teodors (cur.), Riga 1996.
- J. Böttiger: Das königliche Schloß zu Stockholm. Amtlicher Führer, Malmö 1911.
- F. Brunstermann: Die Geschichte der Kleinen oder St. Johannis-Gilde in Wort und Bild, Riga 1902.
- P. Campe: Die Kirchenglocken Lettlands von ältester Zeit an bis zum Jahre 1860 und ihre Gießer, Riga 1930 (Acta Universitatis Latviensis. Architekturas Fakultates Serija, I.1.).
- P. Campe: "Das Stadtgießhaus zu Riga", Baltischer Almanach (1931), pp. 110–120.
- C.M. Cipolla: Segel und Kanonen. Die europäische Expansion zur See, Berlin 1999.
- P.C. Claussen: "Früher Künstlerstolz. Mittelalterliche Signaturen als Quelle der Kunstsoziologie", in: Bauwerk und Bildwerk im Hochmittelalter. Anschauliche Beiträge zur Kultur- und Sozialgeschichte, Clausberg, Karl et al. (ed.), Giessen 1981, pp. 7–34 (Kunstwissenschaftliche Untersuchungen des Ulmer Vereins, Verband für Kunst- und Kulturwissenschaften, XI).
- D. Diemer, L. Hinners: "Gerhardt Meyer made me in Stockholm": a bronze "Bathing Woman" after Giambologna", The Burlington Magazine 160 (2018), pp. 545–553.
- J. Döring: "Die St. Trinitatis Kirche in Mitau", Sitzungsberichte der kurländischen Gesellschaft für Literatur und Kunst (1868), pp. 218–244.
- H-G. Eichler: Handbuch der Stück- und Glockengießer auf der Grundlage der im mittleren und östlichen Deutschland überlieferten Glocken. Eingerichtet von Barbara Poettgen, Greifenstein 2003 (Schriften aus dem Deutschen Glockenmuseum, II).
- G. Elgenstierna: Den introducerade svenska adelns ättartavlor, 9 vols., Stockholm 1925–36.
- Gesellschaft für Geschichte und Altertumskunde der Ostseeprovinzen Rußlands in Riga (ed.): Führer durch die Sammlungen der Gesellschaft im Dommuseum, Riga 1911.
- H. Fett: Norges kirker i det 16de og 17de aarhundrede, Kristiania 1911 (Gammel norsk kultur i tekst og billeder).
- E. Gribsø: "Frederiksborg Amts Kirkeklokker", Frederiksborg Amts Historiske Samfund (ed.), Hillerød 1934, pp. 57–118.
- M. Grieb, ed.: Nürnberger Künstlerlexikon. Bildende Künstler, Kunsthandwerker, Gelehrte, Sammler, Kulturschaffende und Mäzene vom 12. bis zur Mitte des 20. Jahrhunderts, 4 vols., München 2007.
- T. Hach: "Mittheilungen über Rigasche Erzgießer", Rigasche Stadtblätter 75, p. 29 (1884).
- T. Hach: Lübecker Glockenkunde, Lübeck 1913 (Veröffentlichungen zur Geschichte der freien und Hansestadt Lübeck, II).
- L. Hammarskiöld: "Kopparkanoner I Sverige och deras tillverkning", Med hammare och fackla. Årsbok utgiven av Sancte Örjens Gille XVIII (1949/50), pp. 25–64.
- J. Hedberg: Kungl. Artilleriet. Carl X Gustafs tid, Kristianstad 1982.
- L. Hinners: De fransöske handtwerkarne vid Stockholms slott 1693–1713. Yrkesroller, organisation, arbetsprocesser, Stockholm 2012 (Eidos. Skrifter från Konstvetenskapliga institutionen vid Stockholms universitet, XXV).
- L. Hvass, T. Bill-Jessen: Christian 4. som kanonstøber : kongens værksteder ved Kronborg - Gethuset, Hammermøllen og Kobbermøllen, Helsingør Kommunes Museer 2011.
- G. Jensch: "Der Handel Rigas im 17. Jahrhundert. Ein Beitrag zur livländischen Wirtschaftsgeschichte in schwedischer Zeit", Mitteilungen aus der livländischen Geschichte XXIV, 2 (1930), pp. 49–146.
- A.N. Kennard: Gunfounding and Gunfounders. A Directory of Cannon Founders from Earliest Times to 1850, London-New York-Sydney 1986.
- K.M. Kowalski: "Die Glocken aus den Gießereien des Ostseeraumes in Riga und Lettland (im Lichte der Sammlung von Paul Campe)", in: Riga und der Ostseeraum. Von der Gründung 1201 bis in die Frühe Neuzeit, Misāns, Ilgvars and Horst Wernicke (ed.), Marburg 2005, pp. 463–486 (Tagungen zur Ostmitteleuropa-Forschung, XXII).
- J.A.A. Lüdeke: Denkmal der Wieder-Eröffnung der Deutschen Kirche in Stockholm zur öffentlichen Gottes-Verehrung nach volendeter Ausbesserung 1821. Eine Predikt mit diplomatisch-historischen Beylagen, Stockholm 1823.
- A. Magnien: "Les bronzes "Keller"", Bulletin de la société de l'histoire de l'art français 1996 (1997), pp. 37–63.
- C. Mettig, Constantin, F. Moll: Illustrirter Führer durch Riga und Umgebung, Riga 1892.
- L.W. Munthe: Kongl. fortifikationens historia, 6 vols., Norstedt 1902.
- Nordisk familjebok. Konversationslexikon och Realencyklopedi, 38 vols., Stockholm 1904–26.
- R. Pitkäranta: Suomen kirkkojen latina. Piirtokirjoitukset kirkoissa, kellotapuleissa ja hautausmailla. (EFIL Ecclesiarum Finlandiae Inscriptiones Latinae), Helsinki 2004 (Suomen kirkkohistoriallisen seuran toimituksia, CXCIII).
- E. Ploss: "Der Inschriftentypus "N. N. me fecit" und seine geschichtliche Entwicklung bis ins Mittelalter", Zeitschrift für deutsche Philologie LXXVII (1958), pp. 25–46.
- H.W.J. Rickers: Etwas über die St. Olai-Kirche in Reval, die durch einen Blitzstrahl in der Nacht vom 15. zum 16. Juny 1820 zerstört wurde, Reval 1820.
- C.F. Rothlieb: Beskrifning öfver Kongl. Riddarholmskyrkan, Stockholm 1822.
- A. Rudigier, B. Truyols: "Jean Bologne et les jardins d' Henri IV [avec un' avant-propos par Bertrand Jestaz]", Bulletin monumental 174, 3 (2016), pp. 247–373.
- A. Rudigier: ""Letter to the editor" [Response to Diemer, Dorothea/Hinners, Linda, ""Gerhardt Meyer made me in Stockholm": a bronze "Bathing Woman" after Giambologna", in: The Burlington Magazine 160 (2018), pp. 545–553]», The Burlington Magazine 160 (2018), pp. 813–815.
- A. Rudigier, B. Truyols: "Giambologna. Court Sculptor to Ferdinando I. His Art, his Style and the Medici Gifts to Henry IV." Photography by Georg Steinmetzer, London 2019.
- F. Siewert: Geschichte und Urkunden der Rigafahrer in Lübeck, Berlin 1897 (Hansische Geschichtsquellen, I).
- Stockholms Kyrkor VI. S. Klara Kyrka, o.O. 1928 (Sveriges Kyrkor).
- Svenka Konstnärer. Biografisk Handbok, Malmö o.J. (1955).
- H. Hofberg et al.: Svenskt biografiskt handlexikon, 2 vols., Stockholm 1906.
- Svenskt konstnärslesikon, Malmö o.J. [1961].
- R-A. Weigert, C. Hernmarck, eds.: Les relations artistiques entre la France et la Suède 1693–1718. Nicodemus Tessin le jeune et Daniel Cronström Correspondance (extraits), Stockholm 1964.
- M. Thiel: "Das Arsenal in der Citadelle von Riga", Rigaische Stadt-Blätter XVIII, 49–50 (1827), p. 397, pp. 405–407.
- U. Thieme, F. Becker, eds.: Allgemeines Lexikon der bildenden Künstler von der Antike bis zur Gegenwart, 37 vols., Leipzig 1907–50.
- S. Thurm: Deutscher Glockenatlas II. Bayerisch-Schwaben, Grundmann, Günther (ed.), Berlin 1967.
