= Daniel Cronström =

Swedish architect

Daniel Cronström (29 September 1655 in Avesta Dalarna County – 30 August 1719 in Paris) was a Swedish architect working in the Late Baroque style, influenced by the French Louis XIV style.

He entered the foreign service and served in France as a Commission Secretary in 1679. He was sent to Paris in the 1690s as a cultural ambassador whose duty it was to seek out, record in drawings and buy as much as he possibly could of first-rate material related to the decorative arts. The Tessin-Cronström correspondence is an archive of information on French style in architecture and the arts. An exhibition of such drawings from Swedish state collections devoted to Cronström and Nicodemus Tessin the Younger, "Versailles: The View From Sweden" was mounted at the Cooper-Hewitt Museum in New York City during 1988.

== other sources ==
- N. Tessin et D. Cronström, 1964. Les relations artistiques entre la France et la Suède, 1693-1718. Correspondence. (1964)
