= Skräddargränd =

Alley in Gamla stan, Stockholm, Sweden

Coordinates: 59°19′27.50″N 18°4′11.0″E

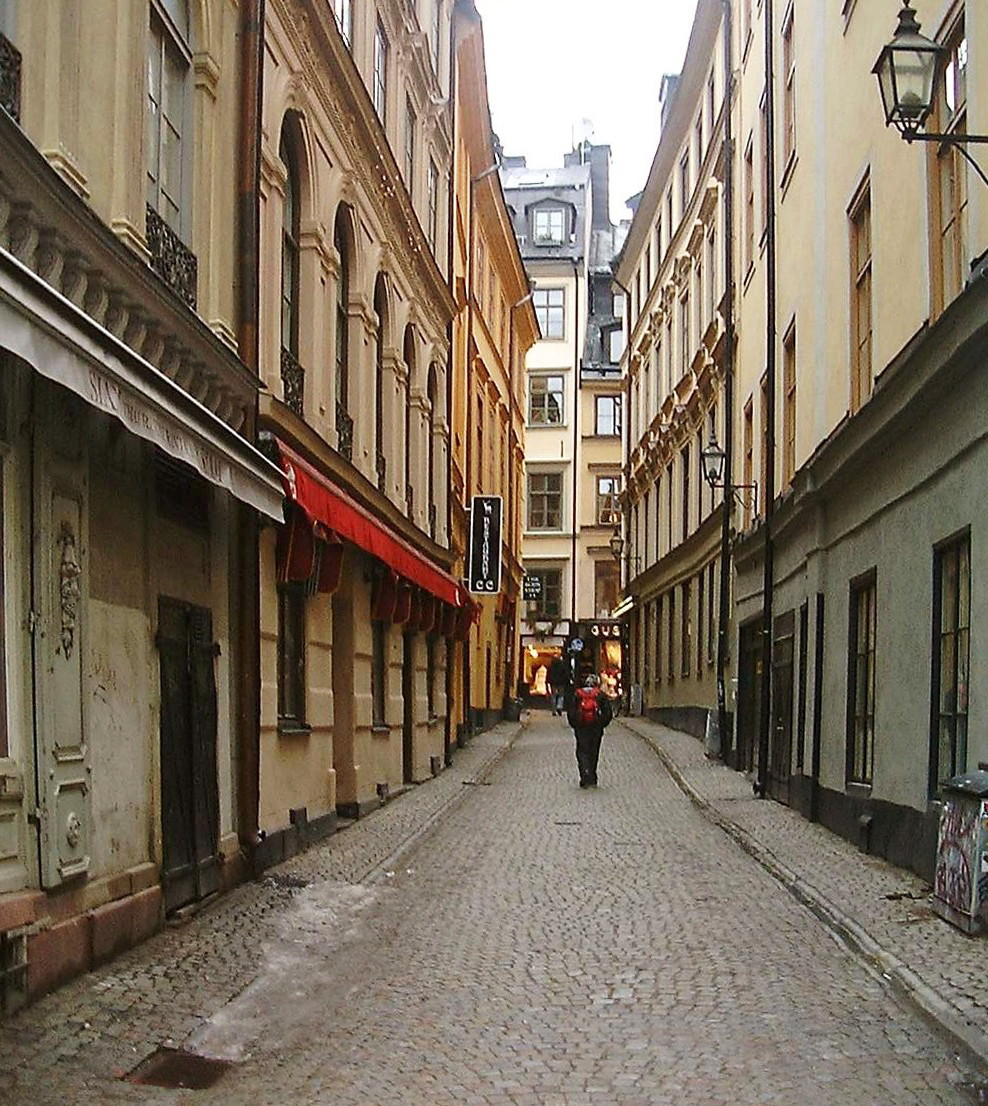
Skräddargränd in March 2007.

Skräddargränd (Swedish: "Tailor's Alley") is an alley in Gamla stan, the old town in central Stockholm, Sweden. Stretching from Västerlånggatan to Stora Nygatan, it forms a parallel street to Bedoirsgränd and Tyska Brinken.

== History ==
The alley was named after the tailor's guild which occupied number 2 between 1627 and 1842. Part of the building then served as the Förgylta Drufvan ("Gilded Grape") tavern sanctioned by King Gustavus Adolphus. The alley was known as Bredgränd ("Wide Alley") at the end of the 15th century, a name shared by several other small alleys in the old town, and explained by its slightly larger width compared to the numerous small alleys north of it.

== See also ==
- List of streets and squares in Gamla stan
