= Helga Lekamens gränd =

Alley in Gamla stan, Stockholm, Sweden

Coordinates: 59°19′31.1″N 18°04′5.9″E

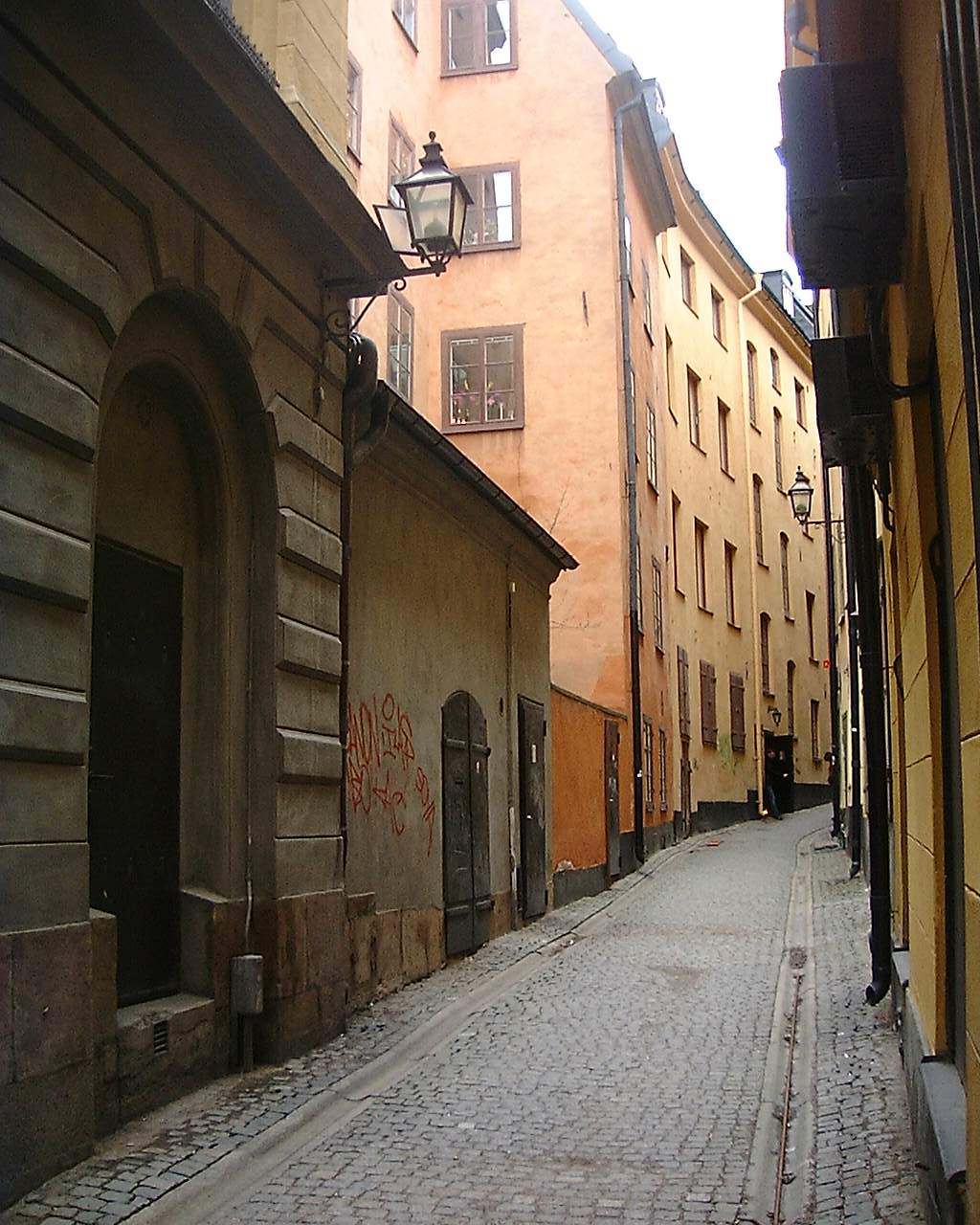
Helga Lekamens gränd

Helga Lekamens gränd (Swedish: "Alley of the Holy Body") is an alley in Gamla stan, the old town in central Stockholm, Sweden. Connecting Västerlånggatan to Stora Nygatan, it forms a parallel street to Stora Gråmunkegränd and Göran Hälsinges Gränd.

== History ==
The alley is mentioned as Helge lycama grendh in 1505, named after Helga Lekamens gille, "Guild of the Holy Body of Christ", during the Middle Ages the biggest guild in Sweden, appearing in historical records in the 14th century and known to count royalties among its members.

The accounts of the guild from the 15th and 16th centuries is still an important historical source offering glimpses of the Medieval era. While many such charity alliances were named after the Body of Christ, the guild in question apparently fell into oblivion following the Reformation, as the name of the alley was shortened to Lekamegränden in the early 17th century, to be renamed Lilla Gråmunkegränd ("Smaller Greyfriars Alley") in 1722. To avoid confusion the old historical name was however resumed in 1922.

== See also ==
- List of streets and squares in Gamla stan
