= Sven Vintappares gränd =

Alley in Gamla stan, the old town of Stockholm, Sweden

Coordinates: 59°19′29.55″N 18°04′07.80″E

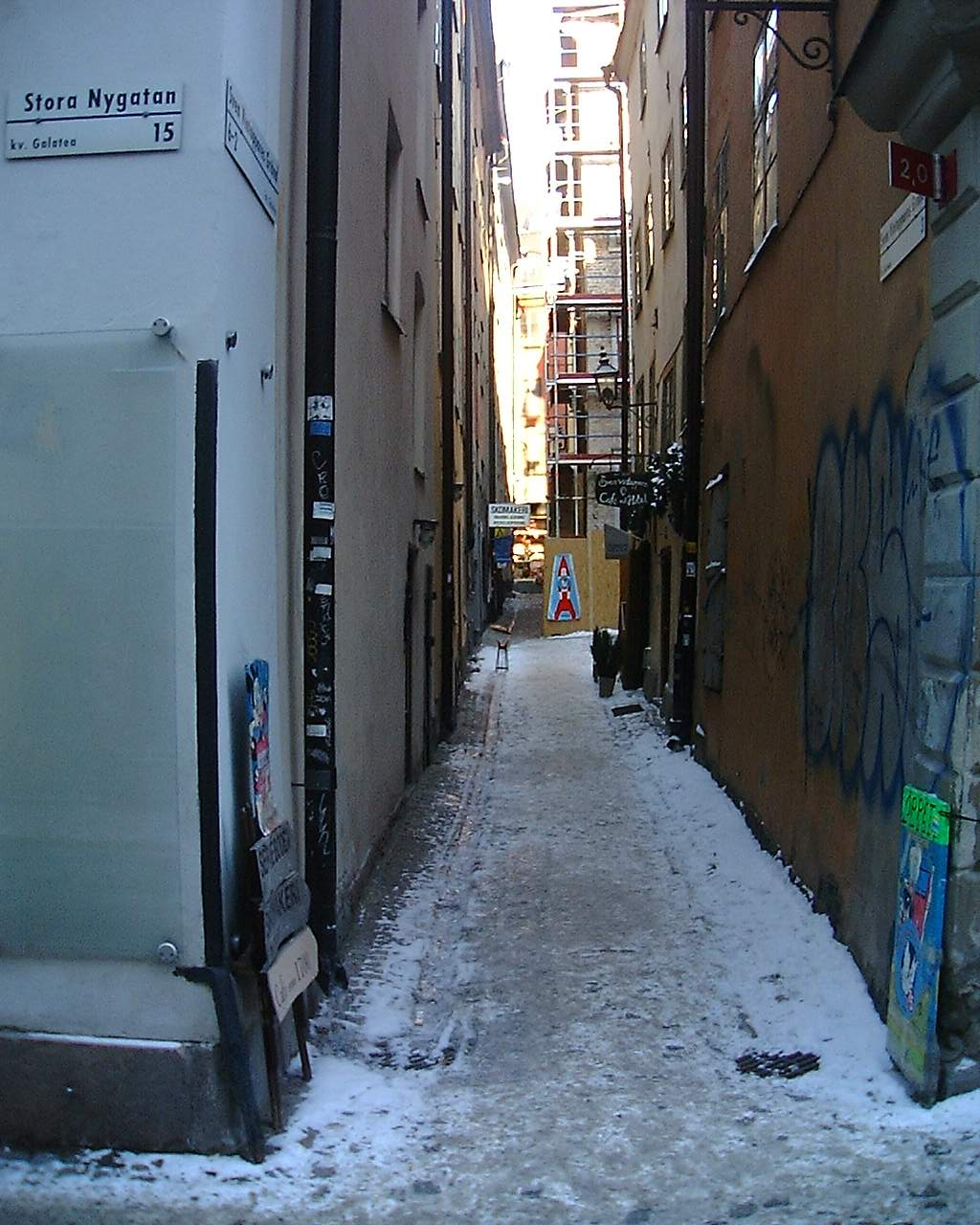
Sven Vintappares gränd in February 2007.

Sven Vintappares gränd (Swedish: Sven Wine-Tapper's Alley) is a small alley in Gamla stan, the old town of Stockholm, Sweden. Stretching from Västerlånggatan to Stora Nygatan, it forms a parallel street to Överskärargränd and Didrik Ficks gränd, while passing on the north side of the small square Sven Vintappares torg.

First mentioned as Swen wintapperes grendh in 1588, the alley is most likely named after Sven Staffansson, a man said to be Kung:e M:ttz tro tienere och wintappere (e.g. "His Majesty's true servant and wine-tapper") and mentioned as having bought a property in the alley. His widow is known to have been given a house on Helgeandsholmen in 1620.

The writer and poet Anna Maria Lenngren (1754–1817) mentions the alley in a poem describing Mårten Holk, an anonymous man living in the alley who drank only water, however upon joining the army he is taught to drink everything but water while obtaining 'a smart coat and a grand desk':

| Mårten Holk, af ingen känd | Mårten Holk, known by none |
| Knappt af hund och katten. | Barely by dog or cat |
| Bodde i Vintappargränd | Lived in Wine-tapper Alley |
| Och drack bara vatten. | And drank only water |
| [...] | [...] |
| Skrattar du min vän? Åh, tig, | Are you laughing my friend? Ah, be silent, |
| Drick och rök din pipa | Drink and smoke your pipe |
| Och lär dig en gång af krig | And learn for once to understand |
| Nyttan begripa! | The benefit of war! |

The author and actress Vera Siöcrona (1914–2003), settled in the alley in the mid-1940s, after her old address at Kolmätargränd had been demolished. She bravely battled the plans to demolish substantial parts of the old town and published the book Mitt Gamla stan ("My Old Town") in 1966. The troubadour Evert Taube (1890–1976), who flirted with her, mentions their encounter in his song Vera i Vintappargränd.

== See also ==
- List of streets and squares in Gamla stan
