= Bankkajen =

Street in Stockholm, Sweden

Coordinates: 59°19′38.2″N 18°04′0.9″E

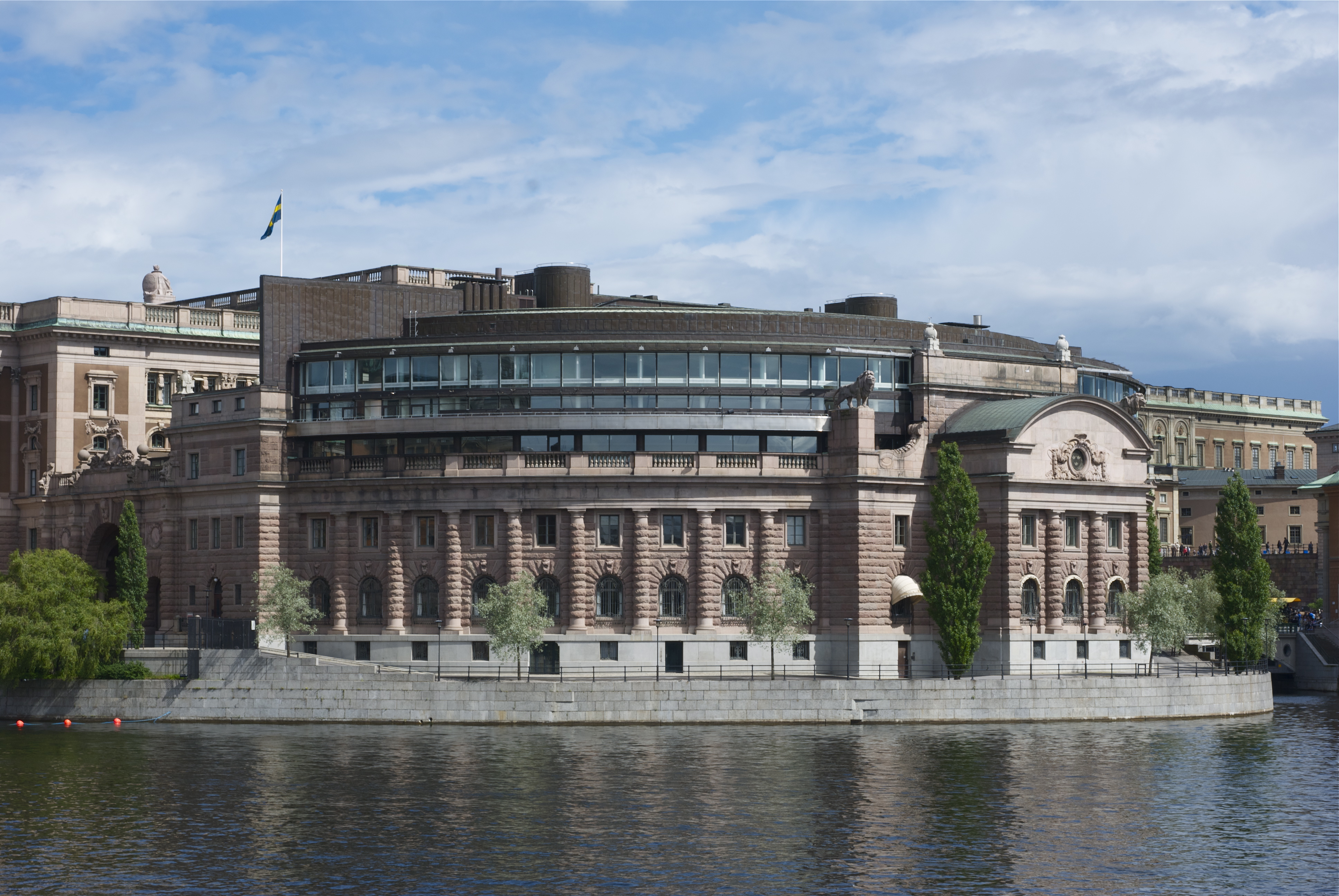
Western part of Helgeandsholmen with Bankkajen passing around the Parliament Building.

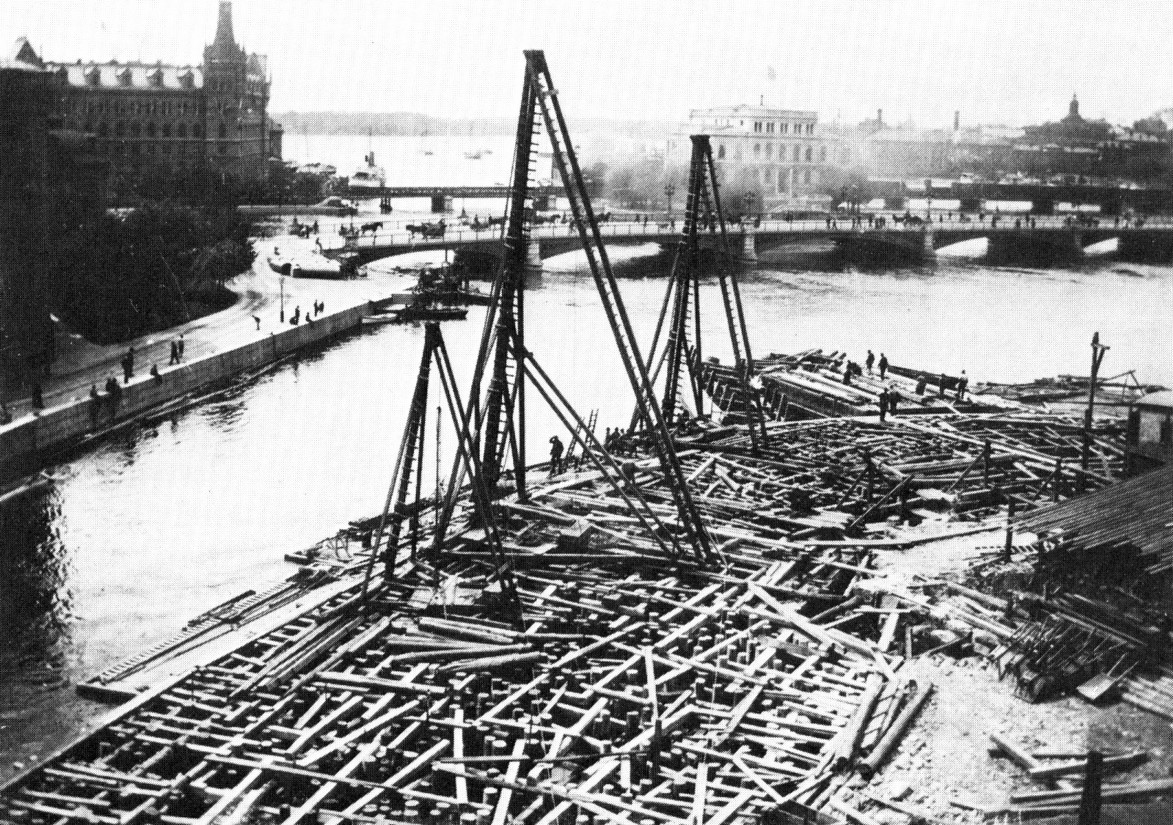
Construction of the quay in 1898.

Bankkajen (Swedish: The Bank Quay) is a quay and a street passing along the western shore of the islet Helgeandsholmen in Gamla stan, the old town in central Stockholm, Sweden.

The name was adopted in 1925, after other proposals such as Banknäset ("Bank Neck") and Bankstranden ("Bank Shore") had been investigated. The quay was reinforced in 2002.

== See also ==
- List of streets and squares in Gamla stan
