= Munkbrogatan =

Street in Gamla stan, Stockholm, Sweden

Coordinates: 59°19′24.9″N 18°04′04.7″E

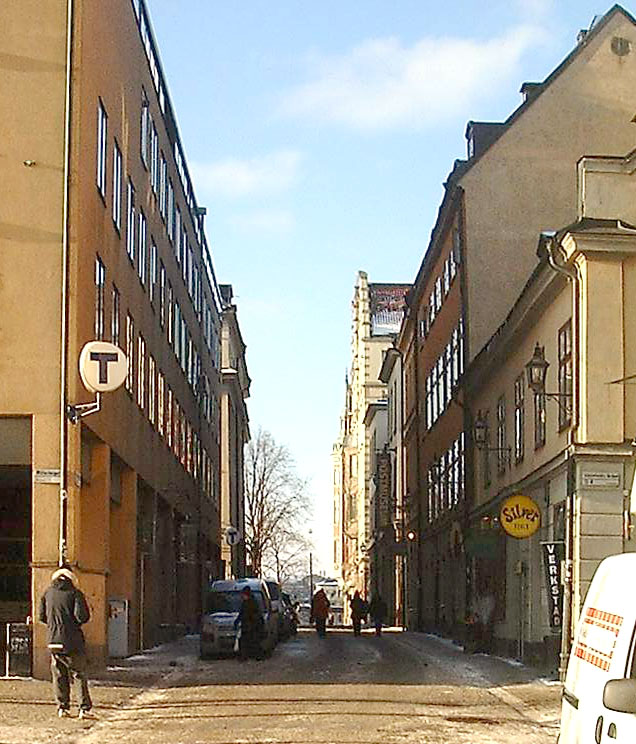
Munkbrogatan in February 2007.

Munkbrogatan is a street in the western part of Gamla stan, the old town in central Stockholm, Sweden. Stretching south between Munkbron and Mälartorget squares, it forms a parallel street to Munkbroleden and Lilla Nygatan, crossed by Yxsmedsgränd, Kåkbrinken, and Schönfeldts Gränd.

Named after the square at the northern end (which, in turn, was named after the Greyfriars abbey once located on Riddarholmen), the street is, together with the neighbourhood, a product of the reconstruction of the western part of the old town following a major fire in the 17th century. It appears in historical records as Munkbrohamnsgatan ("Munkbro Harbour Street") in 1664 and under its present name in 1691.

The street surface was cobbled in 2003–2005, thus replacing the asphalt of the roadway and the concrete slabs of the pavements.

== See also ==
- List of streets and squares in Gamla stan
