= Göran Hälsinges gränd =

Alley in Gamla stan, Stockholm, Sweden

Coordinates: 59°19′31.2″N 18°04′6.1″E

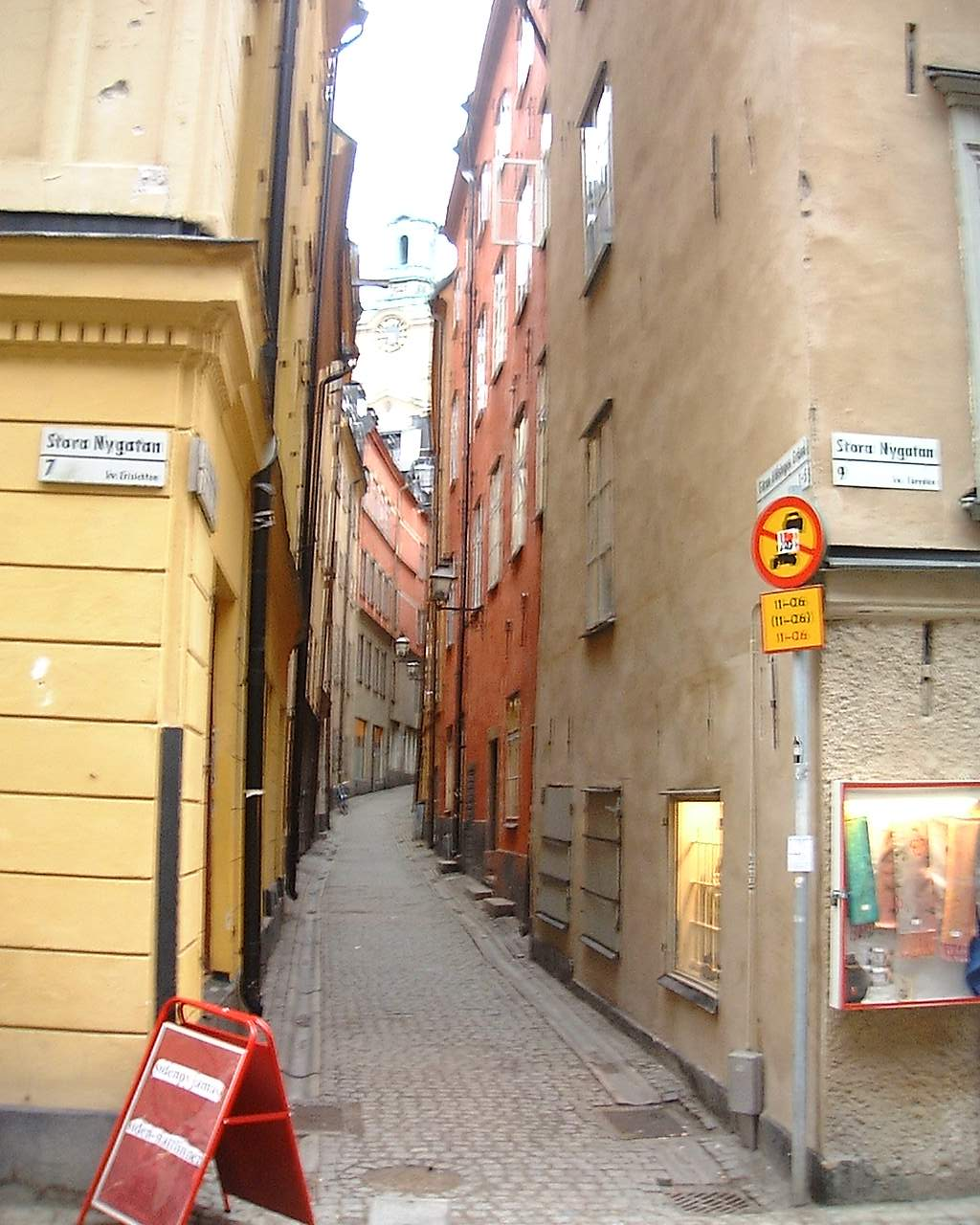
Göran Hälsinges gränd viewed from Stora Nygatan

Göran Hälsinges gränd (Swedish: "Alley of Göran Hälsinge") is an alley in Gamla stan, the old town in central Stockholm, Sweden. Connecting Västerlånggatan to Stora Nygatan, it forms a parallel street to Helga Lekamens gränd and Ignatiigränd.

== History ==
The alley is named after a man without renown, Göran Hälsinge, son to Nils Hälsinge and Appolonia Larsdotter. When King Eric XIV's (1533–1577) was still two years old, his mother, the first consort of King Gustav Vasa Catherine of Saxe-Lauenburg (1513–1535), died unexpectedly, and as Appolonia assisted the royal family as wet nurse she was rewarded a house in the alley, later named after her son. The alley is mentioned as Niels Helsingz grend in 1584, and as Jörenn Helssingz grendh in 1588, but was probably commonly referred to as simply Helsingz grenden (1553).

In his 31st epistle, the troubadour Carl Michael Bellman (1740–1795) gives a hint the alley was associated with prostitution:

Likgott, om en afton jag råka	Nevertheless, an evening I came across
en nymf med ett hängande flor;	a nymph with a hanging veil
jag börja med henne att språka,	with her I started to talk
fick veta precist var hon bor;	got to know exactly where she lives
gränd heter — tyst, lät mig fundera	the alley is named — quiet, let me think
precist Göran Helsinges gränd;	exactly Göran Helsinges gränd;
pong pongtuli pongtuli. Känd	pong pongtuli pongtuli. Known
jag säger ej mera.	I won't say more.

== See also ==
- List of streets and squares in Gamla stan
