= Stora Nygatan =

Street in Gamla stan, Stockholm, Sweden

Coordinates: 59°19′28″N 18°04′08″E

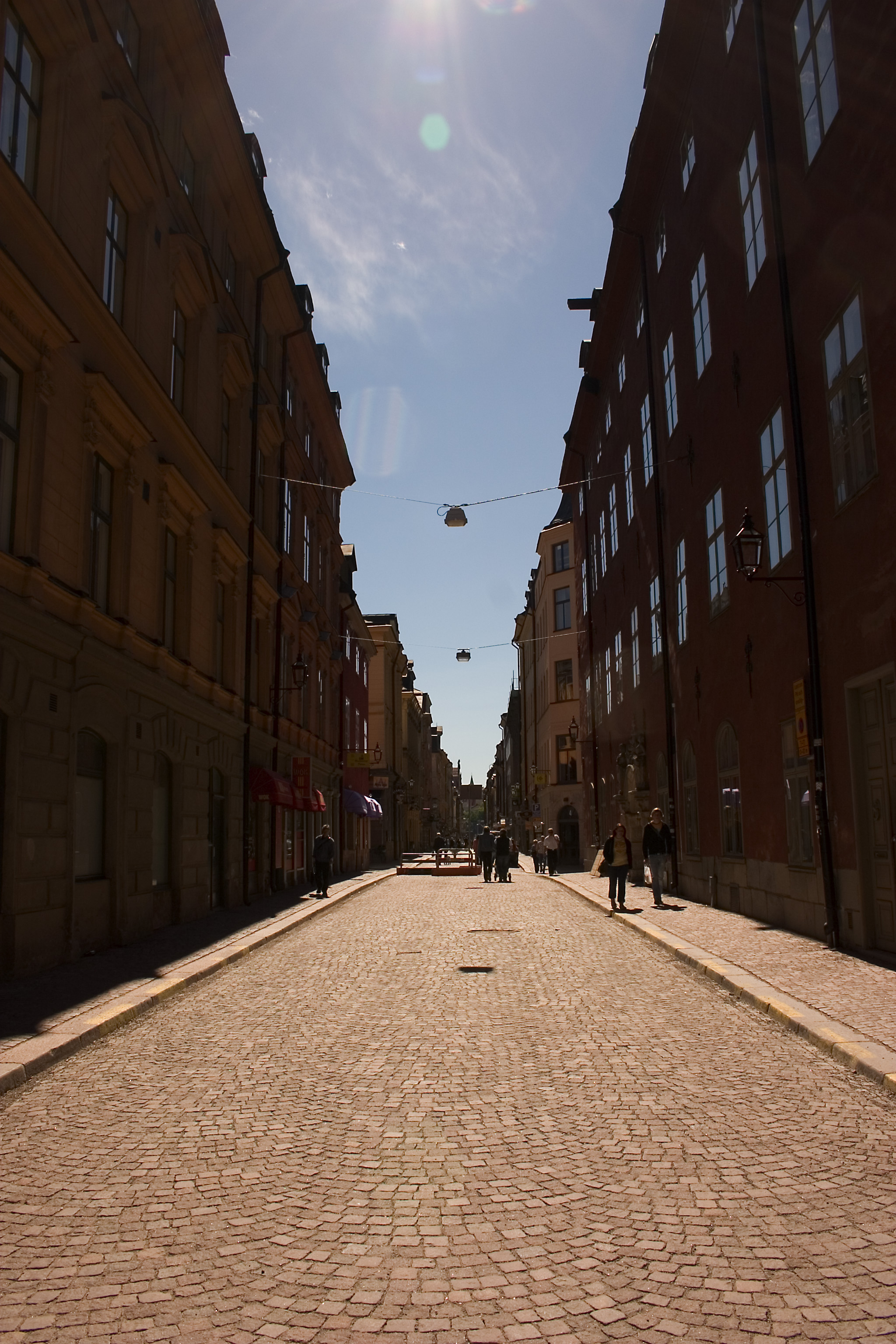
Stora Nygatan in May 2005.

Stora Nygatan is a street in Gamla stan, the old town in central Stockholm, Sweden. The troubadour Carl Michael Bellman lived at number 1 in 1785-1787 and at number 20 (still present) in 1787–88.

== Description ==
- Old names: nyegatun (1636), nyia gaatan, den nya Konnungsgatun, stora konungsgatun (1637), den store Nye gatan (1638), Konnungsgatun (1641), Nye gaten, KongsGaten (1660), Kongs- eller stoora Nygatan, stora Kongs- el' Nygatan (early 18th century), Stora Nygatan (around 1720).
- Parallel streets: Västerlånggatan, Lilla Nygatan.
- Crossing streets: Riddarhustorget, Stora Gråmunkegränd, Helga Lekamens Gränd, Göran Hälsinges Gränd, Ignatiigränd, Gåsgränd, Överskärargränd, Sven Vintappares Gränd, Didrik Ficks Gränd, Yxsmedsgränd, Kåkbrinken, Bedoirsgränd, Skräddargränd, Schönfeldts Gränd, Tyska Brinken, Lejonstedts Gränd, Kornhamnstorg.

== History ==
The street was created as part of a new town plan following the great fire of 1625, and thus probably dates to about 1630. An official attempt to name the street Konungsgatan ("The Kings Street"), a name known from 1637, obviously failed. The southern part of the street dates back to before the fire.

At number two is the Bergstrahl House, originally built in the 1640s by Erik Ryning, member of the regency of Queen Christina, and designed by Simon de la Vallée. In the 18th century it was owned by Secretary Gottfried Sack who ran a tavern and a brothel there, which was frequented by the troubadour Carl Michael Bellman, the authors and poets Karl Israel Hallman and Olof Kexél. When Sack died in 1774, Hallman delivered an oration to his memory, which became the starting point for the order Par Bricole, a society which is still devoted to cultivating and preserving Swedish cultural heritage, especially that from the 18th century. The building was thereafter the location for newspapers and social clubs associated with the dawning Swedish democracy. Lately the address has been used by state institutions such as the Supreme Court.

== See also ==
- List of streets and squares in Gamla stan

== Gallery ==
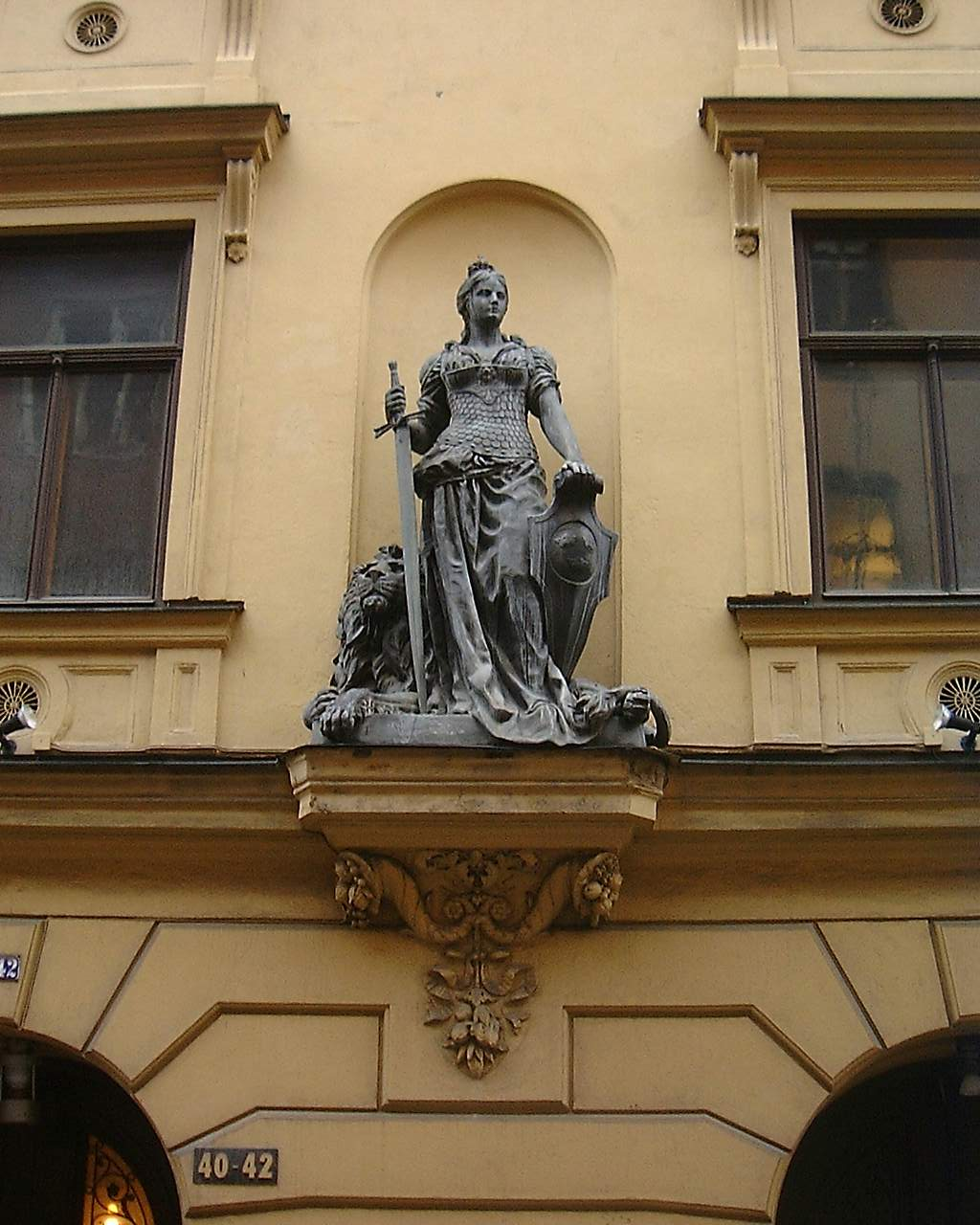
Zinc statue of Moder Svea ("Mother Sweden") by Rolf Adlersparre, 1892–1894. On Number 40–42.

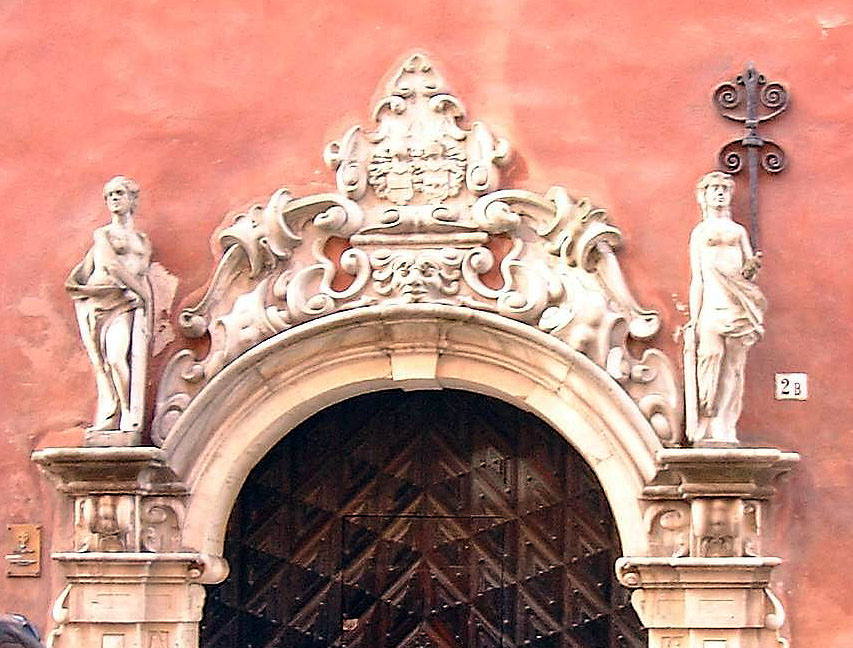
Portal at Number 2B, featuring the escutcheons of Erik and Elisabeth Ryning flanked by Hope and Faith.

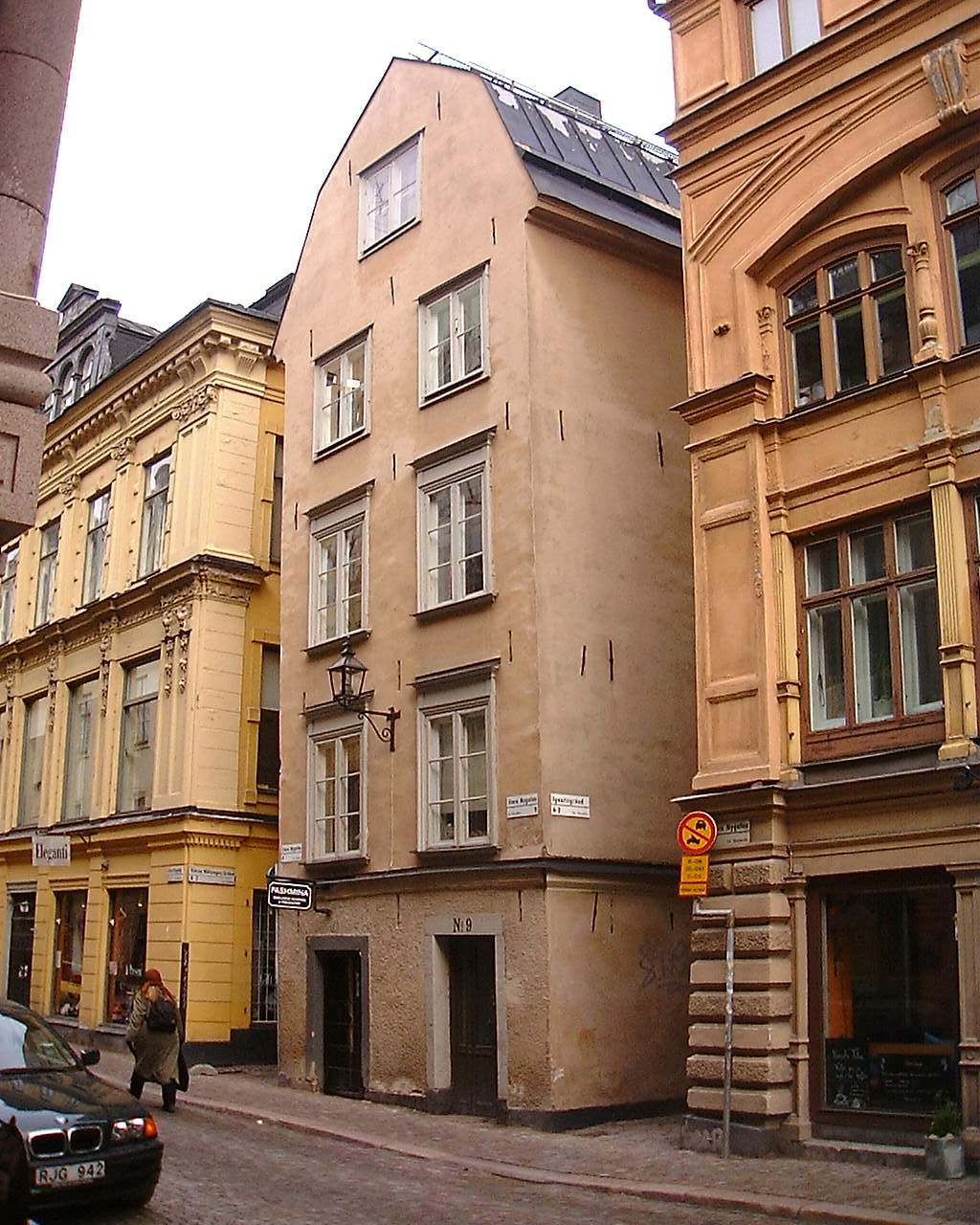
Number 9.

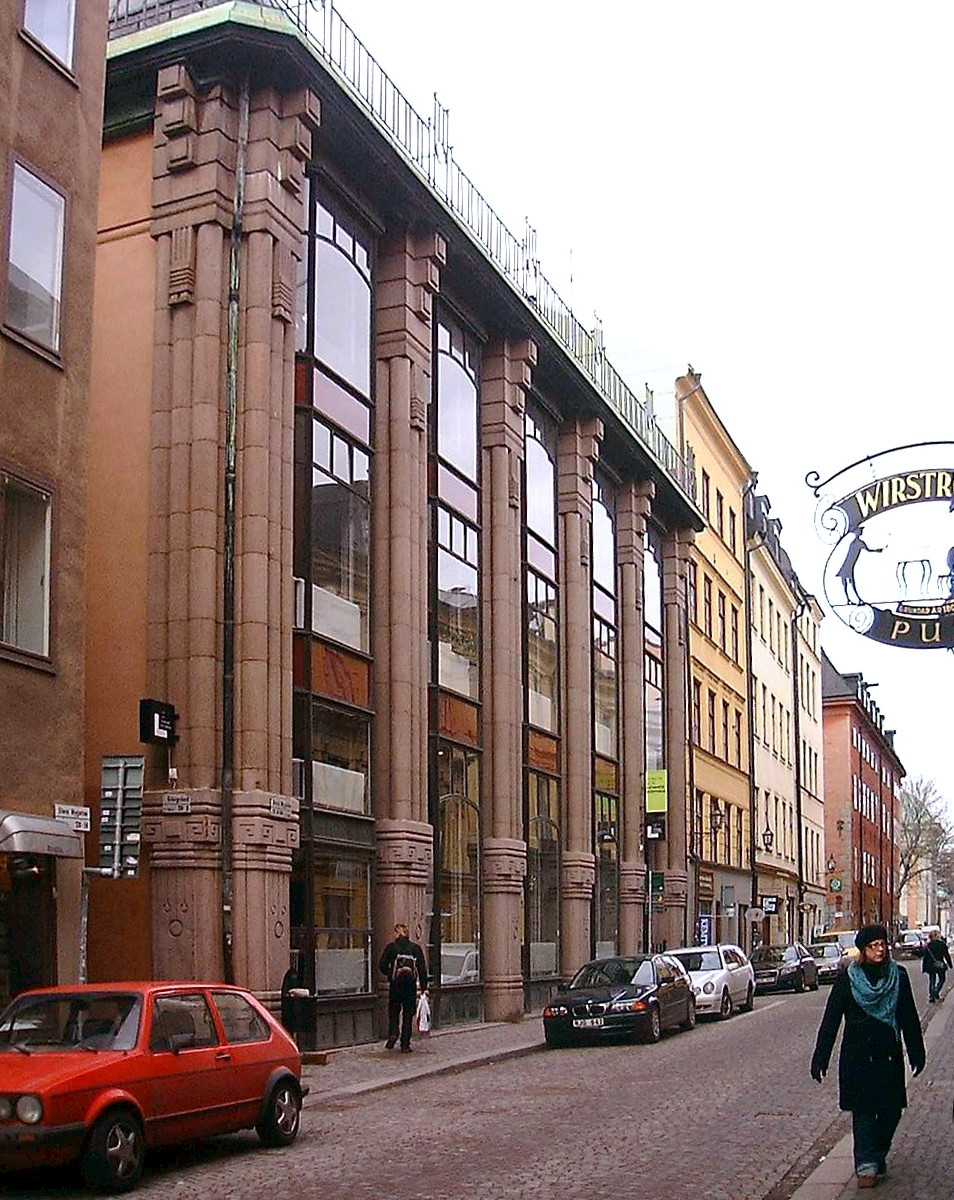
The Living History Forum at number 10–12.
