= List of streets and squares in Gamla Stan =

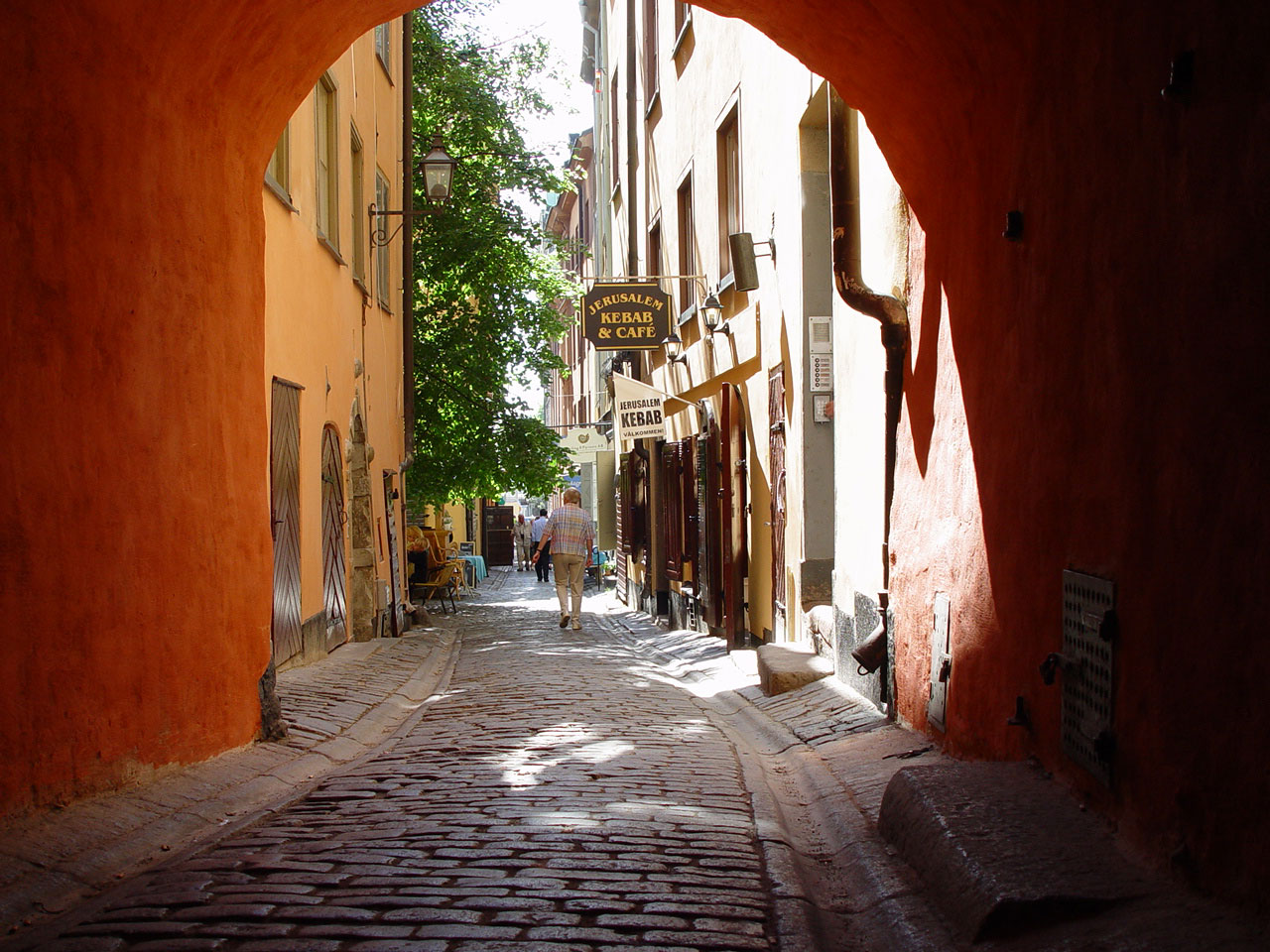
Gåsgränd, one of the alleys of Gamla Stan, in June 2004.

This is an alphabetical list of streets, alley, squares, and other structures in Gamla Stan, the old town of Stockholm, including the islands Stadsholmen, Helgeandsholmen, Strömsborg, and Riddarholmen.

== Historical ==
- Fisketorget
- Fru Gunillas gränd
- Kokhusgränd
- Kvarnhusgatan, see Slussplan
- Räntmästergränd
- Spilaregången

== A ==
- Ankargränd
- Arkivgatan

== B ==
- Baggensgatan
- Bankkajen
- Bedoirsgränd
- Birger Jarls torg
- Bollhusgränd
- Bollhustäppan
- Brantingtorget
- Bredgränd
- Brunnsgränd
- Brända tomten

== C ==
- Centralbron

== D ==
- Didrik Ficks gränd
- Drakens gränd

== E ==
- Evert Taubes terrass

== F ==
- Ferkens gränd
- Finska kyrkogränd
- Funckens gränd

== G ==
- Gaffelgränd
- Gåsgränd
- Gåstorget
- Göran Hälsinges gränd
- Gymnasiegränd

== H ==
- Hebbes bro
- Hebbes trappa
- Helga Lekamens gränd
- Högvaktsterrassen
- Högvaktstrappan

== I ==
- Ignatiigränd
- Inre Borgården

== J ==
- Johannesgränd
- Järntorget
- Järntorgsgatan

== K ==
- Kanslikajen
- Karl Johans torg
- Kindstugatan
- Klockgjutargränd
- Kolmätargränd
- Kornhamnstorg
- Kråkgränd
- Kåkbrinken
- Källargränd
- Köpmanbrinken
- Köpmangatan
- Köpmantorget

== L ==
- Lejonbacken
- Lejonstedts gränd
- Lilla Hoparegränd
- Lilla Nygatan
- Logården
- Logårdstrappan

== M ==
- Munkbrogatan
- Munkbrohamnen
- Munkbroleden
- Munkbron
- Myntgatan
- Myntgränd
- Mynttorget
- Mårten Trotzigs gränd
- Mälartorget

== N ==
- Norra Bankogränd
- Norra Benickebrinken
- Norra Dryckesgränd
- Norra Helgeandstrappan
- Norrbro
- Nygränd

== O ==
- Österlånggatan
- Överskärargränd

== P ==
- Packhusgränd
- Peder Fredags gränd
- Pelikansgränd
- Prästgatan

== R ==
- Riddarholmsbron
- Riddarhusgränd
- Riddarhuskajen
- Riddarhustorget
- Riksbron
- Riksgatan
- Riksplan
- Rådhusgränd

== S ==
- Salviigränd
- Schering Rosenhanes gränd
- Schönfeldts gränd
- Själagårdsgatan
- Skeppar Karls gränd
- Skeppar Olofs gränd
- Skeppsbrokajen
- Skeppsbron
- Skomakargatan
- Skottgränd
- Skräddargränd
- Slottsbacken
- Slottskajen
- Slussplan
- Solgränd
- Spektens gränd
- Staffan Sasses gränd
- Stallbron
- Stenbastugränd
- Stora Gråmunkegränd
- Stora Hoparegränd
- Stora Nygatan
- Storkyrkobrinken
- Stortorget
- Strömbron
- Strömparterren
- Strömsborgsbron
- Svartmangatan
- Sven Vintappares gränd
- Sven Vintappares torg
- Södra Bankogränd
- Södra Benickebrinken
- Södra Dryckesgränd
- Södra Helgeandstrappan
- Södra Riddarholmshamnen

== T ==
- Telegrafgränd
- Torgdragargränd
- Triewaldsgränd
- Tryckerigatan
- Trädgårdsgatan
- Trädgårdstvärgränd
- Trångsund
- Tullgränd
- Tyska brinken
- Tyska brunnsplan
- Tyska skolgränd
- Tyska stallplan

== V ==
- Vasabron
- Västerlånggatan

== W ==
- Wrangelska backen

== Y ==
- Yttre borggården
- Yxsmedsgränd
