= Yxsmedsgränd =

Alley in Gamla stan, Stockholm, Sweden

Coordinates: 59°19′29″N 18°04′09″E

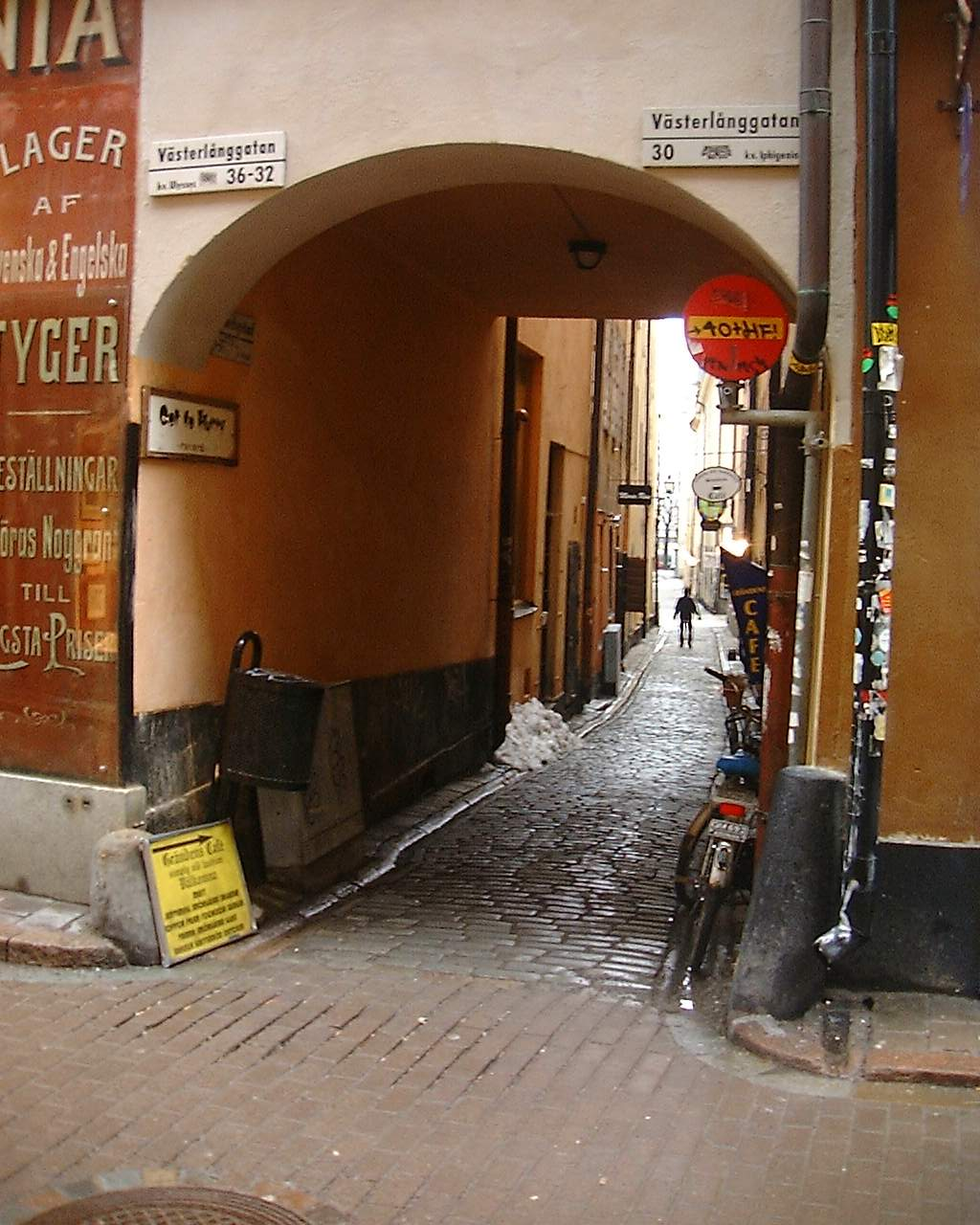
Yxsmedsgränd in March 2007.

Yxsmedsgränd is an alley in Gamla stan, the old town in central Stockholm, Sweden.

Stretching south from Västerlånggatan to Stora Nygatan, it forms a parallel street to Didrik Ficks Gränd and Kåkbrinken and is crossed by Lilla Nygatan and Munkbrogatan.

Throughout its history it appears under various names : Yskemes grenden (1612), Öskiemyss gränden (1623), Yxe Smedes Grenden (1646), Yxe-Smeds gr[änd], Ödesgr[änd], Uttermarks gr[änd] (1733), Yxsmedsgränd (1885).

== History ==
The present name is a corruption of the original Yskemes grenden, probably meaning "The Alley of [Jöran] Yskemes", mentioned as "the late Jörenn Yschemesses" in 1606 and said to have owned a property in the alley. Other than leaving a widow called Marie, little is known about him. The name can arguably be of Estonian or Finnish origin, originally meaning öitsi-mees, "night watchman" (e.g. over cattle). The part of the alley between the two Nygatan streets was however called Herr Amunds gränd ("Alley of Mr. Amund") as early as 1593, a name which appears as late as 1622. The names Hans Skuttes gränd and Olof Skottes gränd, are recorded in 1557 and 1589, and might refer to the same alley. In 1684, the part below Lilla Nygränd was named Uttermarksgränden after the accountant Daniel Benktsson Uttermark who owned a property there. The uppermost part of the alley between Västerlånggatan and Stora Nygatan, the part originally called Yskemes gränd, is referred to as Sigfrid Olofssons gränd in 1589 and 1621 while a property there is referred to as Yskemetshuset ("house of Yskemet") in 1616 and 1618. The name then appears in various forms during the middle of the century, the corrupted version dominating historical documents by 1673. On a map dated 1733 the alley is still divided into three parts with individual names - Yxsmedsgränd being used exclusively for the upper part - only to get united as Yxsmedsgränd in 1885.

== Song ==
The street features in Carl Michael Bellman's song Fredman's Epistle no. 28, "I går såg jag ditt barn, min Fröja", when the muse Ulla Winblad, who lives there, flees from the police. The song begins with the lines

I går såg jag ditt barn, min Fröja,
I Yxsmeds gränd

"Yesterday saw I thy child, my Freya
In Yxsmeds alley"

== See also ==
- List of streets and squares in Gamla stan
