= Barbara Pauli =

Swedish fashion trader

Barbara Suzanne Pauli (1752 or 1753 – fl. 1780) was a Swedish fashion trader. She belonged to the most successful business entrepreneurs of Stockholm and described as the center figure of Stockholm fashion trade during the Gustavian age. Her fashion shop, named Temple du Goût, was located in Stockholm and was a major competitor to the city's guilds.

== Life ==
Barbara Pauli was reportedly of French origin, daughter of the French court jeweler Pierre Pauli. In October 1775, she was given royal permission to open a fashion shop in Stockholm and manufacture, import and sell fashion items. She was at that point 22 or 23 years old and unmarried.

Her trade permit was given by the crown, and was thereby in fact a dispensation over the objection of the head of the Silk- and Clothing Guild. It was common for women in Stockholm to be given a dispensation by the crown to manage a business. Such permits were otherwise normally issued by the guilds, and it was hard for women to obtain a trade permit from a guild because it was difficult (albeit not impossible) for them to become guild members, so most businesswomen sidestepped the guilds by an appeal to the crown instead, and such appeals were normally successful. However, the case of Barbara Pauli was unusual because other women in her position claimed that they only wished to start a small business to support themselves: Pauli, on the other hand, stated no such reason in her application, and her business were not to be a small business for self-support, but a big and hugely lucrative business enterprise which seriously threatened her guild competitors.

=== Temple du Goût ===
Her fashion shop was named Temple du Goût and situated at the Västerlånggatan street by the square Mynttorget not far from the Royal Palace, and side by side with the business of Mrs Holming, which was one of the first Konditorei in Sweden.

Pauli owned and managed her fashion shop, and imported and sold the latest French fashion items. She also manufactured such items in the latest French style by the help of orphan girls from the Stora Barnhuset, who were pupils in the fashion trade, and whom she used as assistants in her trade. In 18th-century Sweden, the professional making of clothing was under monopoly of the Taylor's Guild, and professional seamstresses were formally not allowed to make entire clothes, only to remake old models or make parts of clothes, but in practice, this regulation was not respected nor did the authorities enforce it. Formally, however, the Pauli workshop only manufactured French models of caps, shawls, ribbons and other fashion accessories. Barbara Pauli is described as the most famed fashion trader in contemporary Stockholm, and her Temple du Goût as the center of fashion of Gustavian age Stockholm. In 1780, her success is evident from the fact that only one of the traders of Norrmalm was taxed for more than her, and only two of the Norrmalm tailors was taxed as much as she.

== In literature ==
Barbara Pauli was a well known figure in contemporary Stockholm. She is mentioned in the poem Råd i en angelägen sak ('Advice in a Difficult Task') by Anna Maria Lenngren from 1780; in the poem Nyårsvers ('New Year's Verse') by Johan Henric Kellgren from 1781, and in the first part of the history- and topography book of Stockholm by Johan Elers, Stockholm from 1800.

== See also ==
- Anna Maria Thalén
