= Klockgjutargränd =

Alley in Gamla stan, Stockholm, Sweden

Coordinates: 59°19′33.9″N 18°04′06.9″E

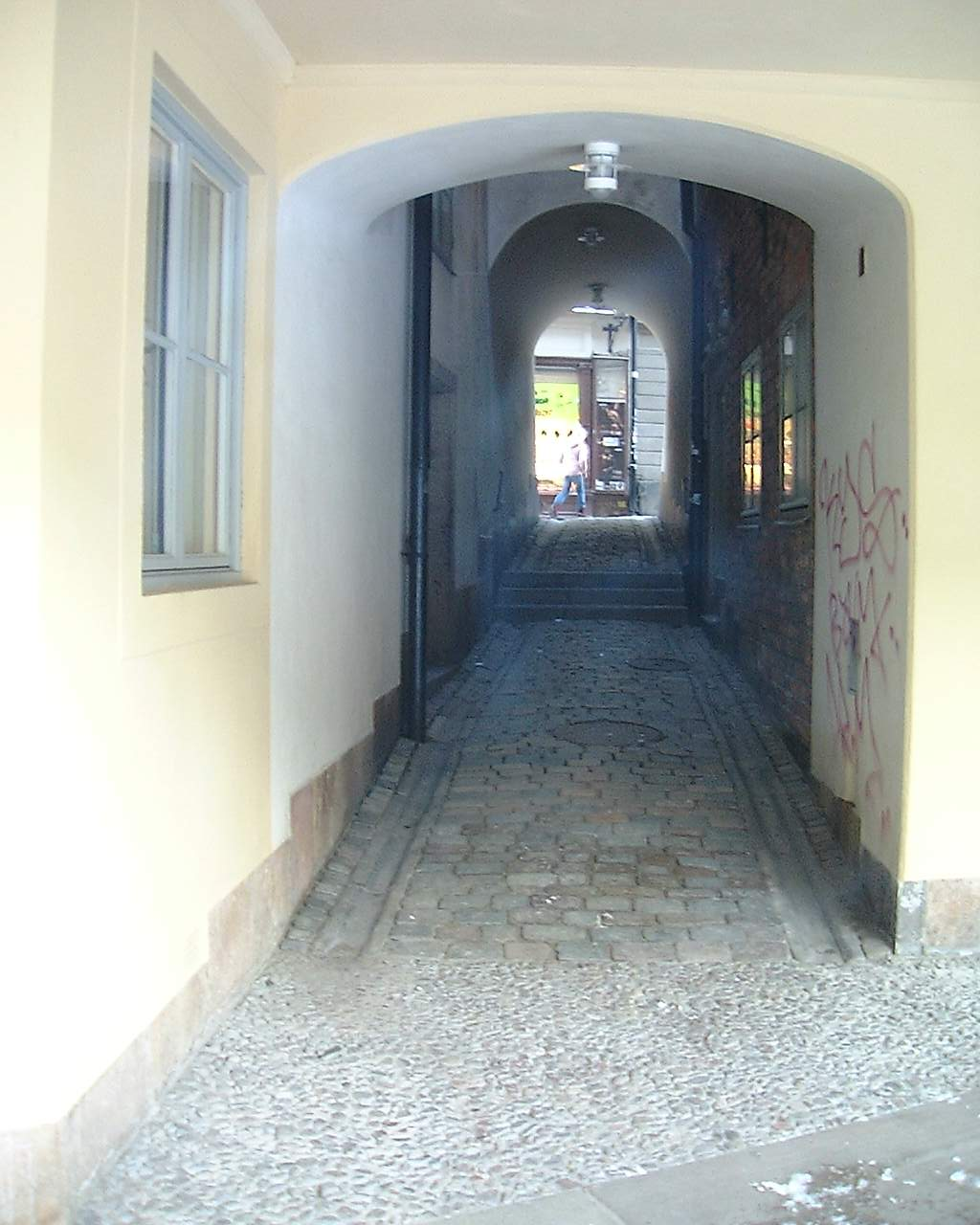
Klockgjutargränd in February 2007.

Klockgjutargränd (Swedish: "Bell-Founder's Alley") is a small alley in Gamla stan, the old town in central Stockholm, Sweden. Passing under a low vault, it connects the street Västerlånggatan to the public square and courtyard Brantingtorget, forming a parallel street to Salviigränd and Kolmätargränd.

Recorded as Klåchgiuatre gränden in 1687, the alley is named after a German bell-founder named Jurgen Putens, who may have immigrated from Lübeck in 1620. In Swedish sources he is referred to as Jöran Putenson, and is recorded as having bought a house in an alley called Olof Köttmånglares gränd ("Alley of Meat Hawker Olof"). Known as a talented craftsman, he founded the bells of Stockholm Cathedral and introduced the fire-extinguisher in 1621, badly needed during the great fire of 1625. He was among the first craftsmen to have relocated his foundry to Kungsholmen in 1647. The alley is mentioned as Hiortens gränd in 1720.

== See also ==
- List of streets and squares in Gamla stan
