= Västerlånggatan =

Street in Gamla Stan, Stockholm, Sweden

Coordinates: 59°19′27.9″N 18°04′11.9″E

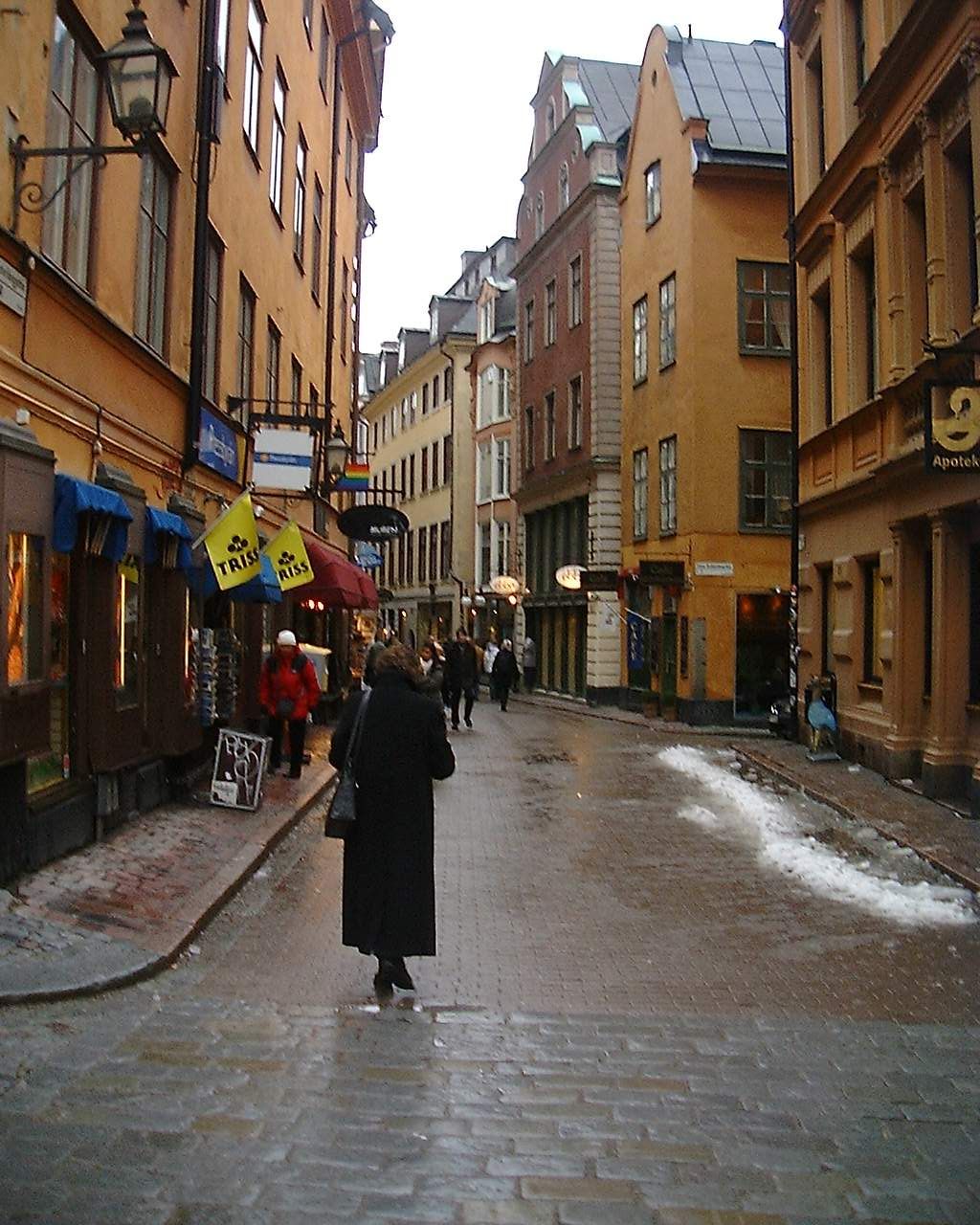
Västerlånggatan from Storkyrkobrinken.

Västerlånggatan ("the Western Long Street") is a street in Gamla Stan, the old town of Stockholm, Sweden. Stretching southward between the squares Mynttorget and Järntorget, it follows the course of the city's now demolished 13th-century defensive wall.

The blocks along the street are elongated but only a few meters in width; those on the eastern side oriented lengthwise, and those on the western crosswise. Only four blocks thus forms the eastern side of the street while some 20 are lined-up along the western side. Most (but not all) of the front doors of the buildings are located either on the quiet Prästgatan, the parallel street passing along the eastern side, or in one of the numerous alleys on the street's western side. The intact façades of the northernmost blocks are hiding the semi-detached offices of the Riksdag. To the south of those are the remaining numerous and very narrow blocks and alleys which before the great fire of 1625 occupied the entire western side of the street.

== Origin of the name ==
Today renowned as one of Gamla Stan's most picturesque and busy tourist magnets, Västerlånggatan was for many centuries one of the major streets of Stockholm together with Österlånggatan, both of which ran outside the city walls. During the 15th century, they were both called Allmänningsgatan ("The Common Street") or Långa gatan ("The long street"), occasionally in combination, like Allmenninx longe gathen or longe Almenninx gathen in 1514, and/or with a suffix such as västan till ("to the west") appended. The current name was officially established in 1885.

== History ==
Originally the street was little more than a pathway passing just outside the city's western wall and following the shoreline, as the gently meandering street still reminds us. It did however connect the northern city gate, Norrbro, with the southern, Söderbro, and it was thus the main route between Uppland, the province north of the city, and Södermanland, south of the city.

During the 15th century, the street became the paved artery road it still is today, with dwellings and shops on either side. During the Middle Ages and the Vasa era, the southern part of the street formed part of the district centred on Järntorget, at the time the most prominent quarters in the city inhabited by influential merchants such as Mårten Trotzig, Mårten Leuhusen and Erik Larsson von der Linde. Along the rest of the street craftsmen had their small workshops, and the northernmost section, stretching between Mynttorget and Storkyrkobrinken, was called Stadssmedjegatan ("City's Smith's Street"), because the blacksmiths who were confined outside the city because of the danger of fire had their headquarters there. During the 17th century this section was instead inhabited by goldsmiths and accordingly climbed the ranks.

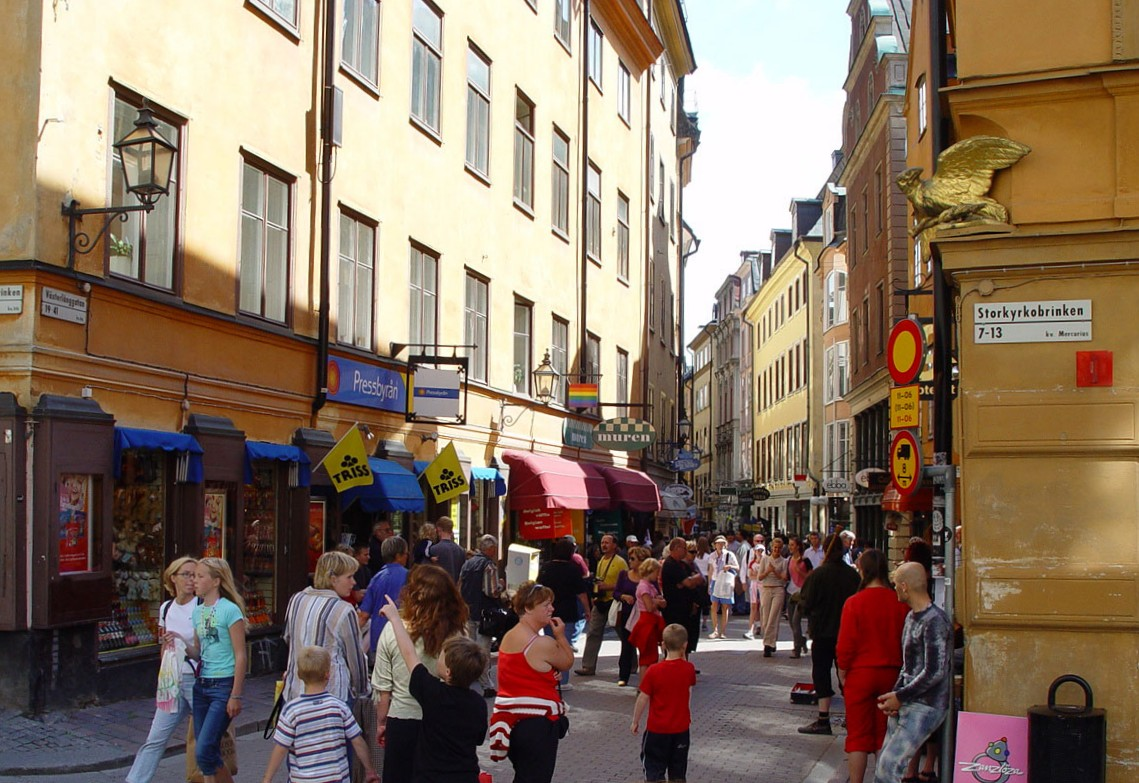
Västerlånggatan a busy summer day.

From the middle of the 19th century, the commercial centre of Stockholm was transplanted north of the old town that gradually started to transform into a slum district. Västerlånggatan however escaped this fate, as it was connected to Drottninggatan by the bridge Riksbron in 1907, and the shops along the street were updated. The medieval street façades were transformed in accordance to the taste of the day; plaster ornaments and cast iron colonettes mail-ordered from Germany replaced the medieval fronts, resulting in the present large shop windows usually displaying the well-preserved interiors from the later part of that century while concealing the often still intact medieval cores of the buildings.

Many of the boutiques founded during the 19th and early 20th century, were still around until the late 1970s; the northern section packed with hotels, while the remaining street was renowned for its milliner's shops including up to 30 coat shops. Today, the street is also home to some of Stockholm's more exclusive shops, including Bottega Veneta, Dior, Gucci, Max Mara, Louis Vuitton, Georg Jensen, Mulberry, Cerruti, Chanel, Moncler, Prada, Tiffany & Co. and Versace. There are also several well-known restaurants, cafes and bars in the area, with one notable international restaurant being TGI Fridays.

Notwithstanding, Swedes and tourists alike still love to mingle among the boutiques, the medieval gables and the later additions, the street thus preserving its old ways — still offering its musicians to Stockholmers hurrying to work in the morning; blustering pub-crawlers still vexing stoic dwellers, and the old forged iron signs continuing to ignore the neon signs still tempting passers-by with all sorts of gadgets. Gone are, however, the filth, funeral processions, and prostitution in the area brilliantly described by the troubadour Carl Michael Bellman.

== A walk north to south ==
=== Mynttorget-Storkyrkobrinken ===
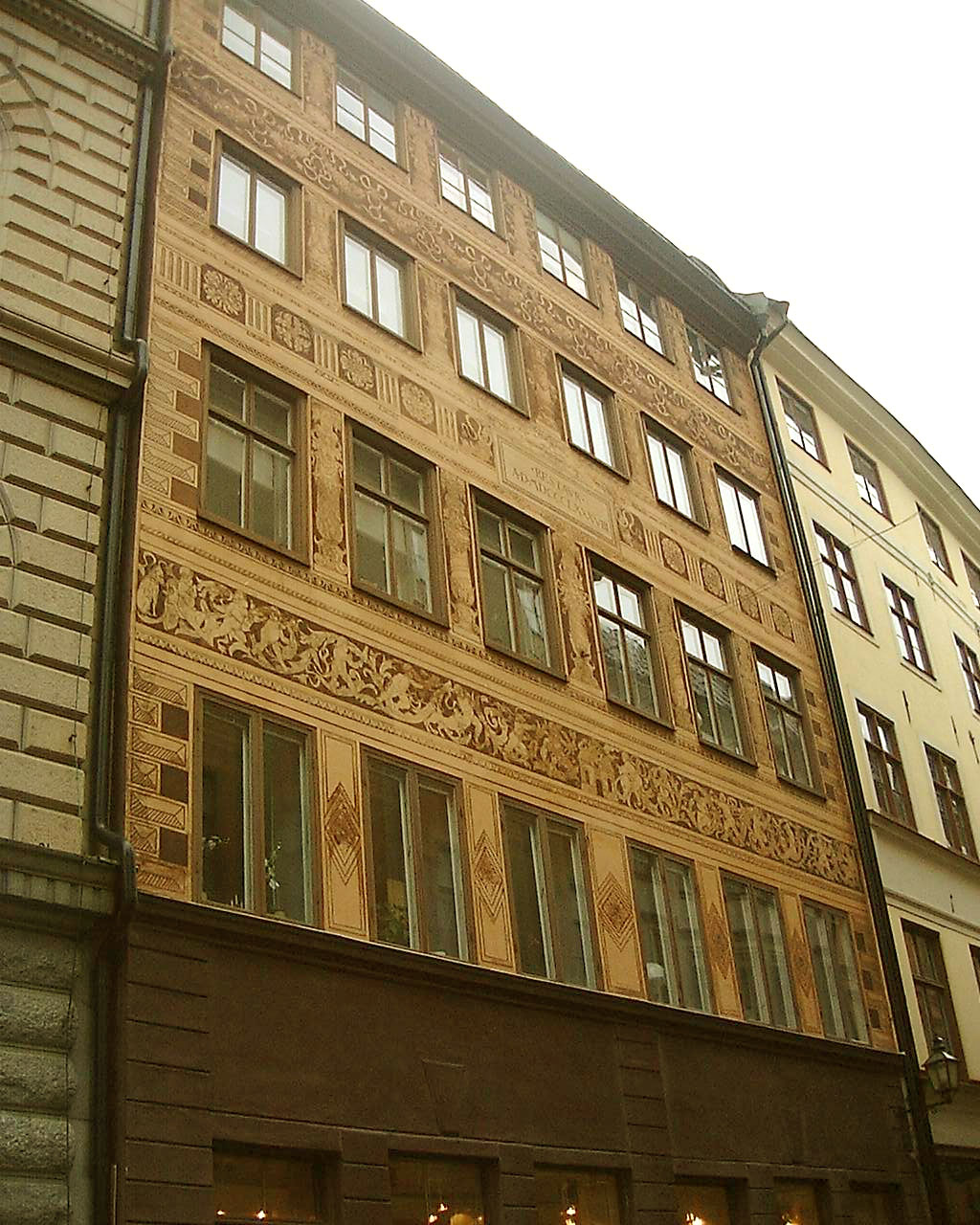
Sgraffito façade on Number 7.

On Number 1–5 is Demokrativerkstaden ("Democracy Workshop"), a pedagogical role-playing environment operated by the Riksdag offering young school children the chance to act as MPs for a few hours.

Salviigränd, named after Johan Adler Salvius (1590–1652), the Swedish main negotiator during the Peace of Westphalia in 1648, used to stretch down to the water. On the left corner (Number 1) is a suite of rooms featuring a neoclassical interior from 1795 restored to its original state, sumptuously furnished and richly decorated with friezes and medallions.

On Number 6 was until recently the bookstore Hemlins bokhandel. It was founded in 1864 and taken over by Emil Hemlin in the 1880s. From the late 18th century and well into modern times, the neighbourhood used to be the quarters of the 'printed word', the part of the city where both the books and their consumers were located, and were people from other parts of the country would come to find and talk about the latest novels.

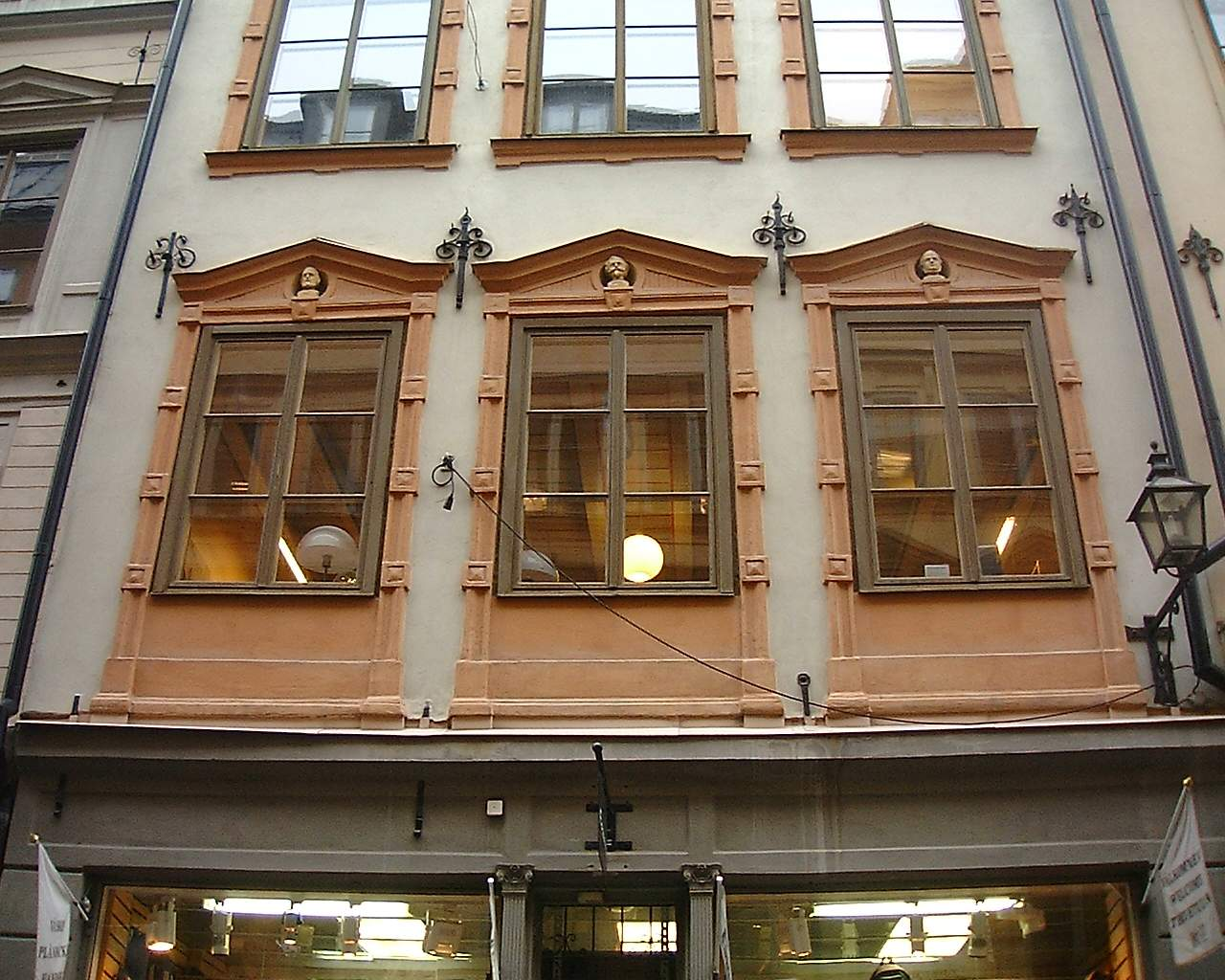
Victor Emanuel II, Garibaldi, and Cavour on Number 13.

Above street level and behind the intact front, Number 7–17 are the semi-detached offices of the Riksdag. On number 7 are Roman letters displaying the year 1888 when the Neo-Renaissance sgraffito façade was created. On number 13 above the windows on the first floor, are the heads of Victor Emanuel II, Garibaldi and Cavour, obviously added by someone favourably disposed towards the Italian unification. The entire block is hiding the northern end of Prästgatan, one of the few blind ends of the old town, which was historically known as Helvetesgränd ("Alley of Hell"), either because the city executioner resided in the area or because the entire neighbourhood is located north of the cathedral (e.g. in Norse folklore associated with the "Kingdom of the Dead").

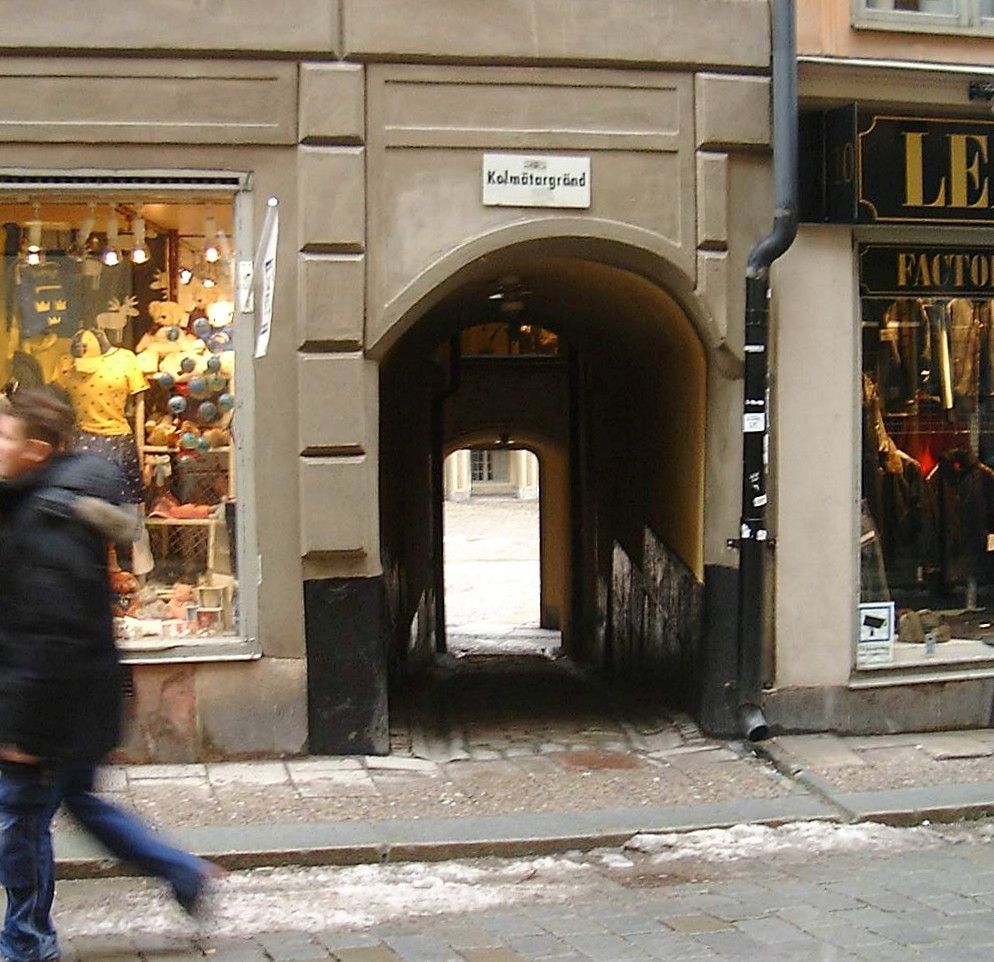
Kolmätargränd

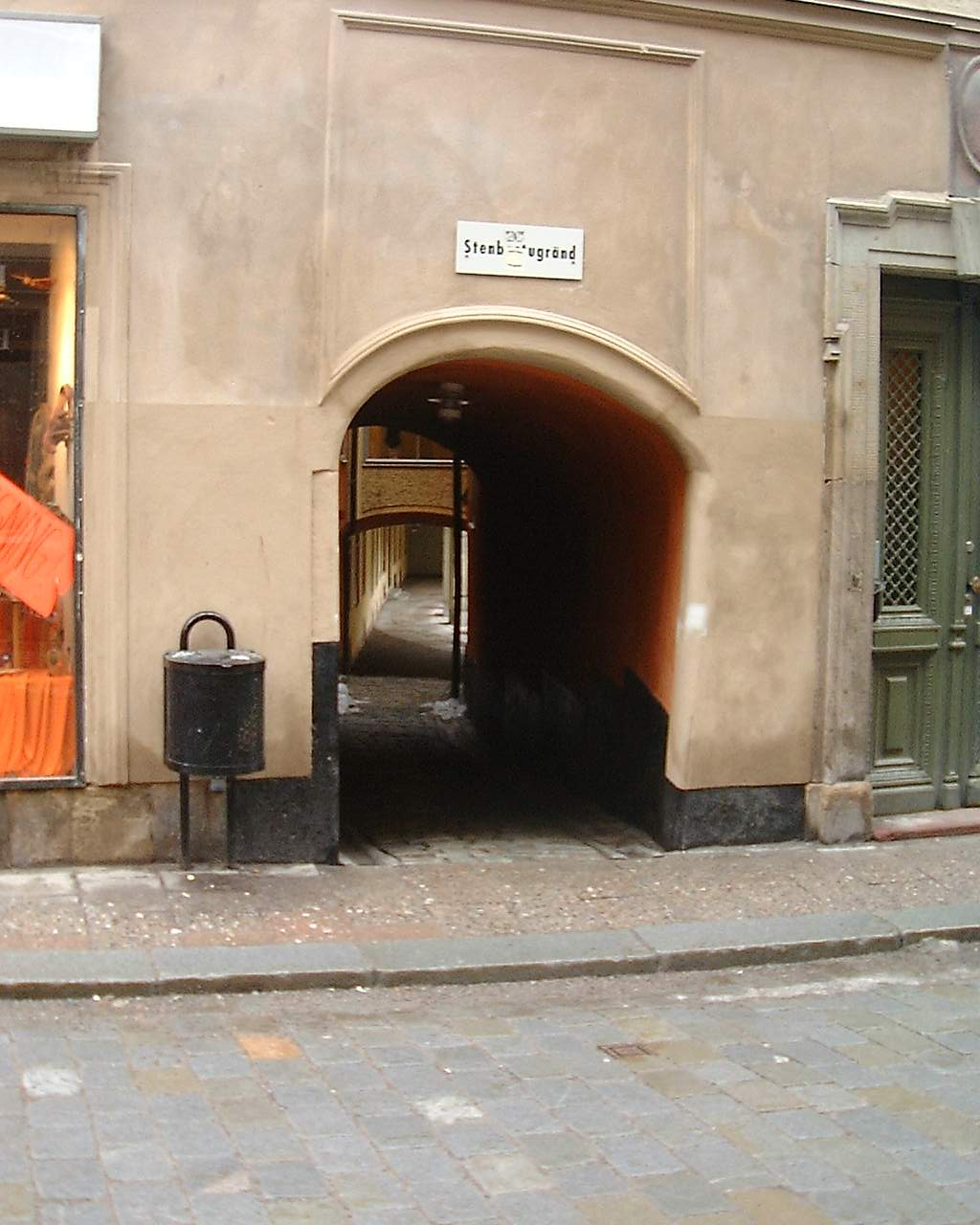
Stenbastugränd

On the opposite side, Number 8–14, is another block occupied by the offices of the Riksdag. The intact front hide the semi-detached interior where a few clerks are sitting next to fresco paintings from the 16th and 17th centuries and sculpted beams featuring animals. The three small vaults and their respective street signs — Klockgjutargränd, Kolmätargränd, Stenbastugränd — gives a hint of what the neighbourhood used to be before WW2 when the circular courtyard, Brantingtorget, was created and the three alleys stretched much further west.

Just east of the crossing between Storkyrkobrinken and Västerlånggatan, the main northern city gate used to stand during the Middle Ages. At the time a narrow alley, the street was widened during the 1650s in order to create a more stately connection between the Royal Palace and the palaces on Riddarholmen.

=== Storkyrkobrinken-Kåkbrinken ===
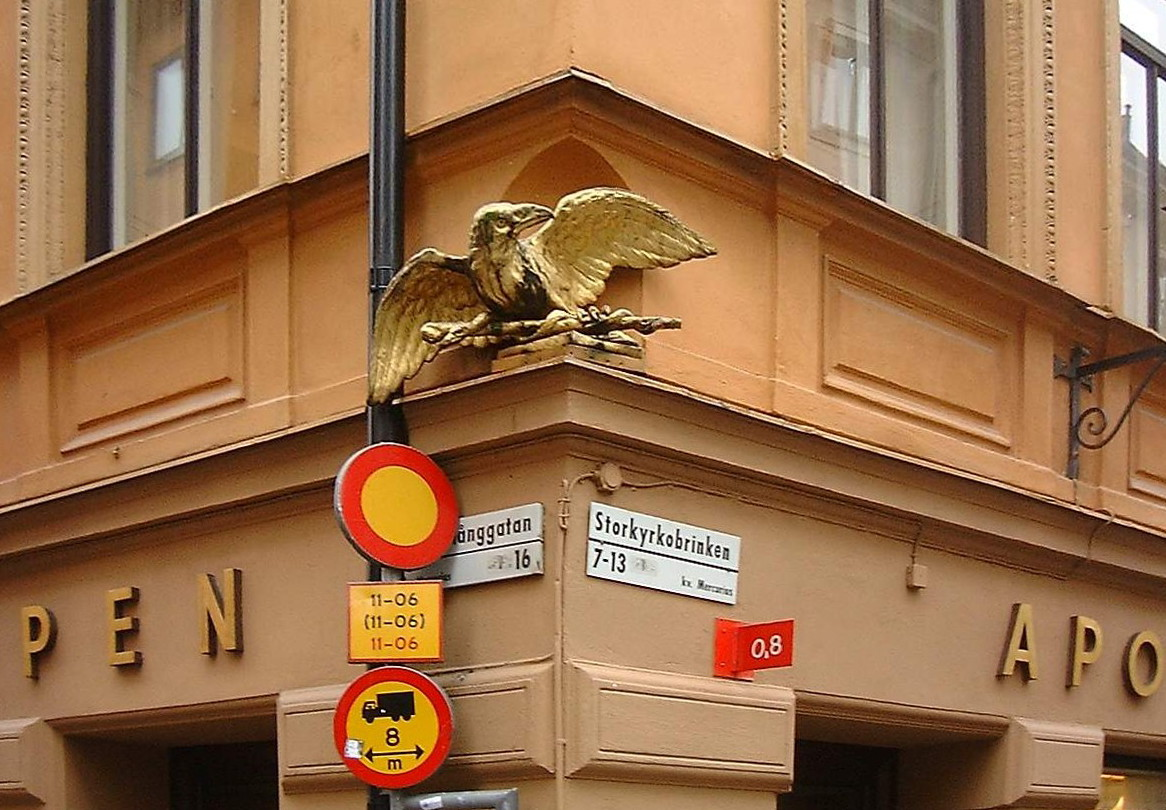
The gilded bird of the Raven Pharmacy.

On Number 16 is the gilded raven of Apoteket Korpen ("The Raven pharmacy") founded in 1674 and located on Stortorget during 250 years. It was one of the few and one of the oldest pharmacies in Stockholm, a city with all to few doctors and frequently ravaged by epidemics, flues, and plague, pestilences thought to be cured using frogs, snakes, human fat, and pulverized mummies. Today there is a preserved interior from 1924, and the pharmacy only offers factory-made medicine, except for the Christmas mustard made after its own recipe.

The café Gråmunken on Number 18 is a well-established café, since several generations renowned for the medieval vaults in the basement. While a gravel ridge composes most of the soil in the surrounding area, the block behind the café is built on solid rock located above sea level during the Viking Age, and hopefully future excavations will be able to further document the earliest history of the area. Archaeological excavations in the street just outside Number 18 have unveiled several layers of earlier street levels, with traces of paved streets found a metre below the present pavement. North of Number 18 is Stora Gråmunkegränd ("Great Grayfriars Alley"), which used to lead from the Greyfriars islet (Riddarholmen) to the defensive tower on the east side of Västerlånggatan. South of the café is Helga Lekamens Gränd ("Alley of the Holy Body [of Christ]"), named after an influential guild existent from the 15th century to the Reformation (1520s). Between these two alleys is a barred alley.

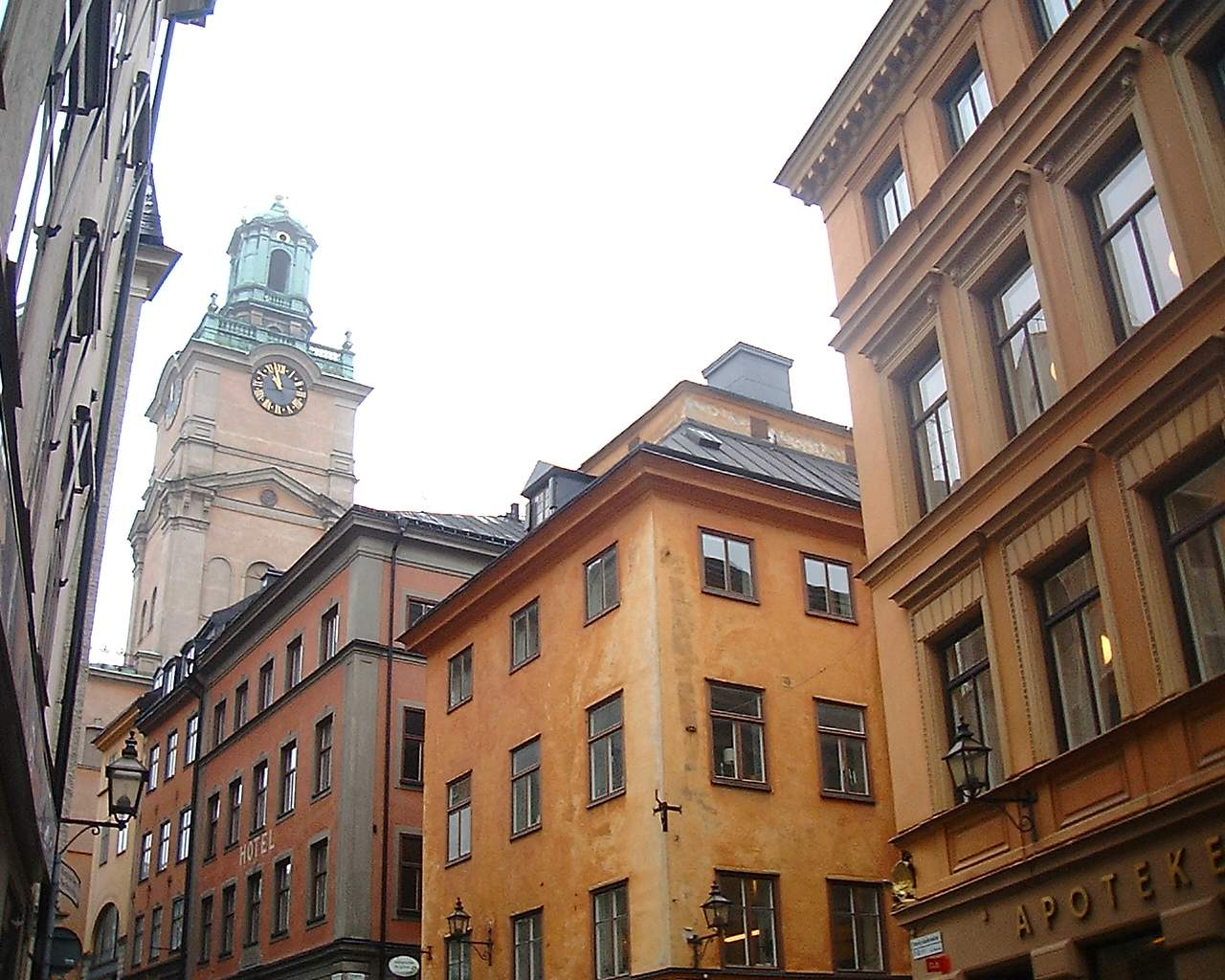
The Swedish-style mansion roof on Number 19 and the Cathedral in the background.

Behind the café and its rainbow flag on Number 19 is the story of one of the oldest shops in the world: The ironmonger's shop of C J Bergman founded in 1654, established on this address in 1712, and taken over by Bergman in 1842. When discontinued in the early 1980s, it was the last institution of the many blacksmiths' shops and workshops once occupying the entire neighbourhood and offering horseshoes, swords, guns, pots, and nails. The roof of the building is a Säteritak — a Swedish-style mansion roof introduced in the 17th century and featuring a so-called Italian, a low storey dividing the roof into a lower and an upper part and usually containing either rooms for servants or a promenade floor with a panoramic view over the city.

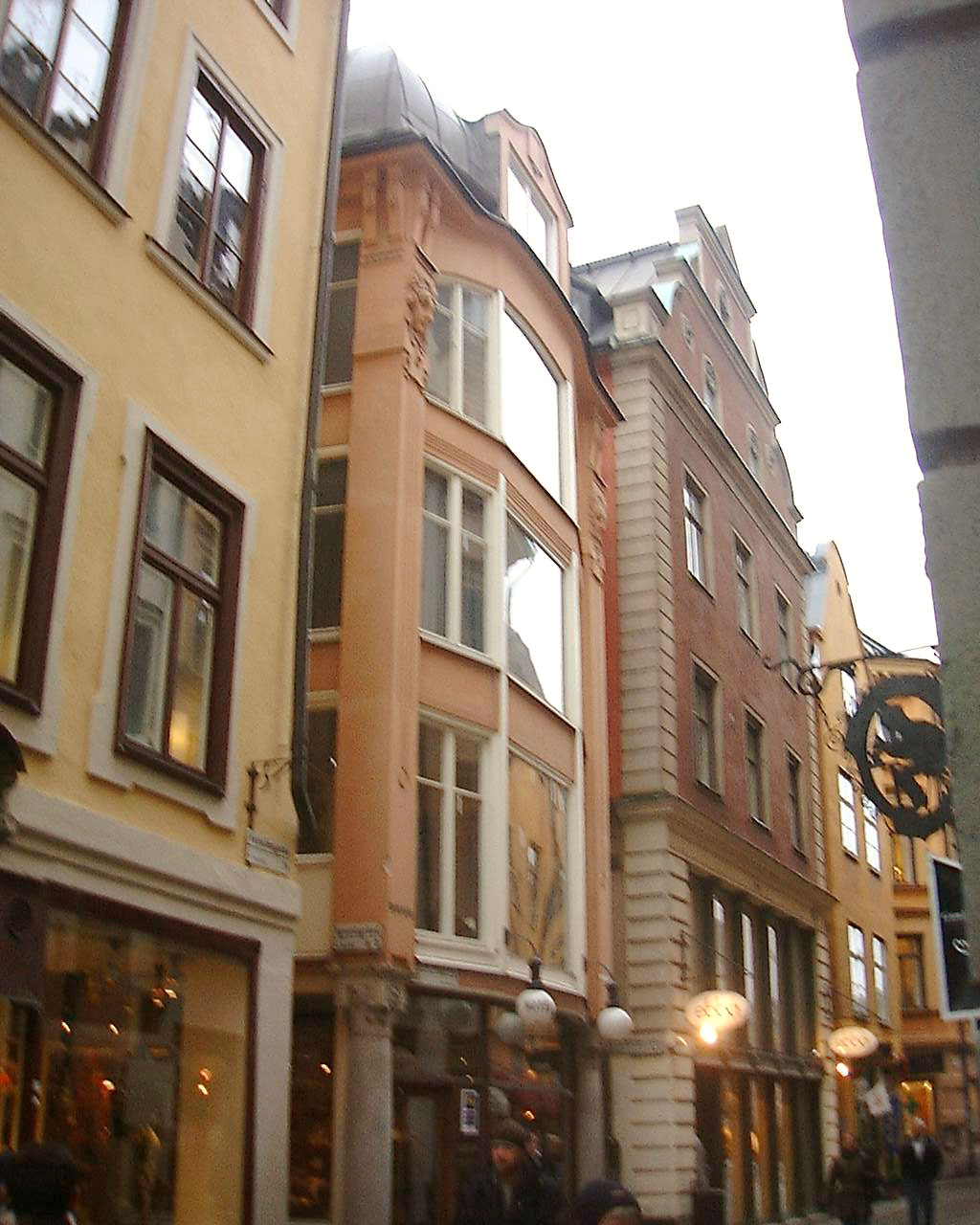
Lord Nelson Hotel on Number 22.

The Art Nouveau glazed façade on Number 22 is from 1907 and the building, slightly less than five metres wide, is arguably the narrowest hotel in town. However inviting, the building safeguards stories of both local and national heroes: During the 18th century a number of taverns succeeded each other's on the address, one of which was the "Deft & Done" (Flink & Färdig), named after the inscription on one of the emergency coins of King Charles XII, and owned a by Catharina Burman, a woman renowned for "intoxication, oaths, scolding, and curses". A hundred years prior to this two printers resided in the block; one was Arnold Helsing, the other his journeyman Ignatius Meuer, who immigrated to Stockholm from Thuringia, Germany, in 1610 and 21 years old took over the printing house. Before Ignatius died 83 years old, the nine presses in his workshop had produced the Ordinari Post-Tijdender, the oldest newspaper in the world, and the Bible of Charles X in Swedish. Ignatius and the son of the former printer eventually gave their names to the two alley flanking the hotel: Ignatiigränd and Göran Hälsinges Gränd, the latter is otherwise mostly remembered through the lyrics of the troubadour Carl Michael Bellman who describes the alley as renowned for its prostitutes.

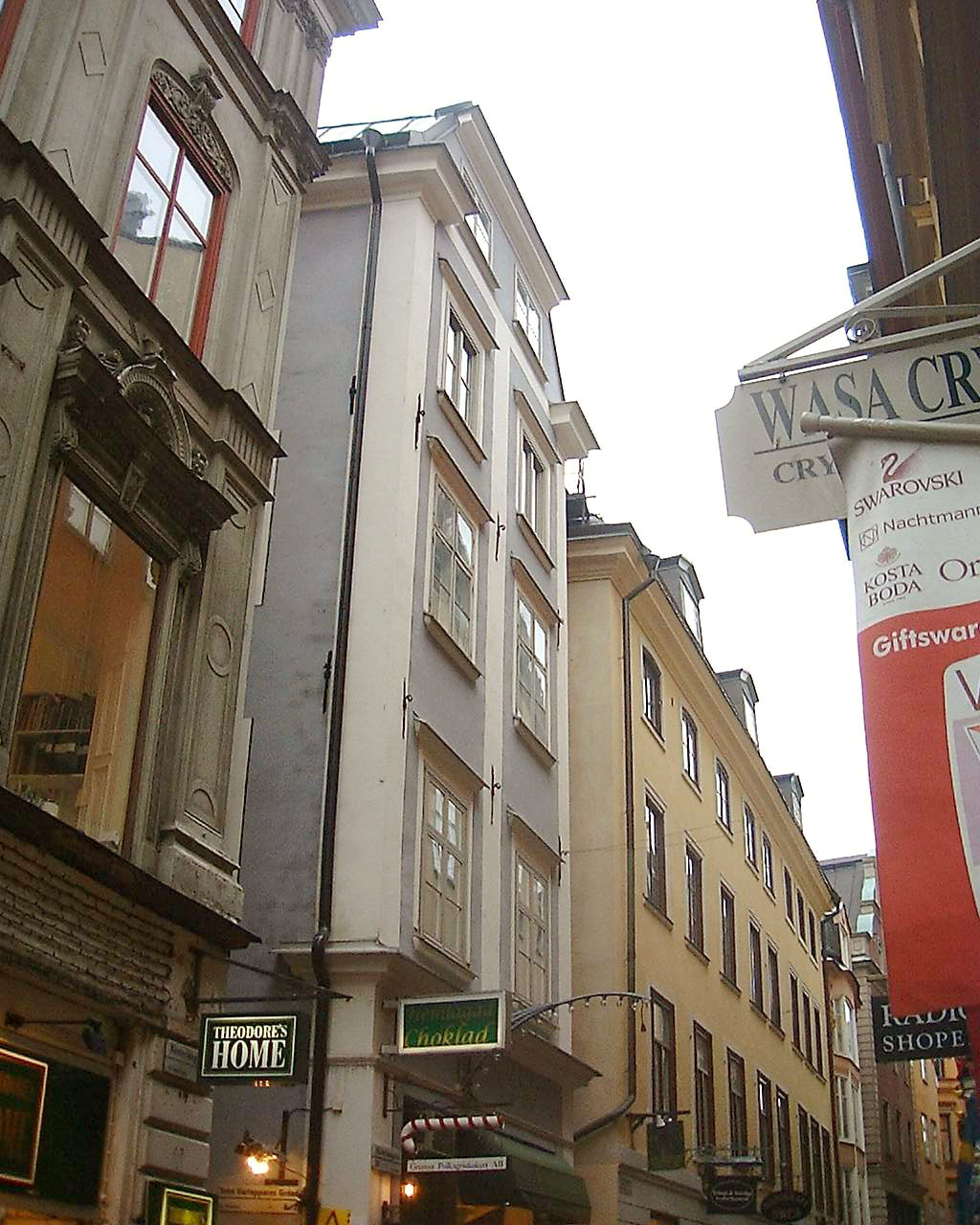
Number 26, one of the narrowest buildings on the street.

On Number 24 and 24 A are two friezes accompanied by a legend — A ship got stuck in a lull but was miraculously saved by a beautiful lady who brought the captain down to her palace under the waves. In return for favourable winds she had the captain promise to deliver a letter to a Mr. Måns on Västerlånggatan immediately on his return. Back in Stockholm, however, the captain forgot his promise and choose to unship his goods before delivering the letter. When he finally went to deliver it, he was told the only Mr. Måns in the building was a cat, which upon reading the letter fell into tears, scratched the captain to death before jumping the window only to get turned into stone. A historian is likely to give the alternative explanation the cats are in fact Rococo-style martens added to the medieval building by the furrier Nikolaus Björk in the 1740s, but that's another story. The alley passing through the building, Gåsgränd, and the one south of it, Överskärargränd, both lead to Gåstorget, one of the smallest squares in Stockholm.

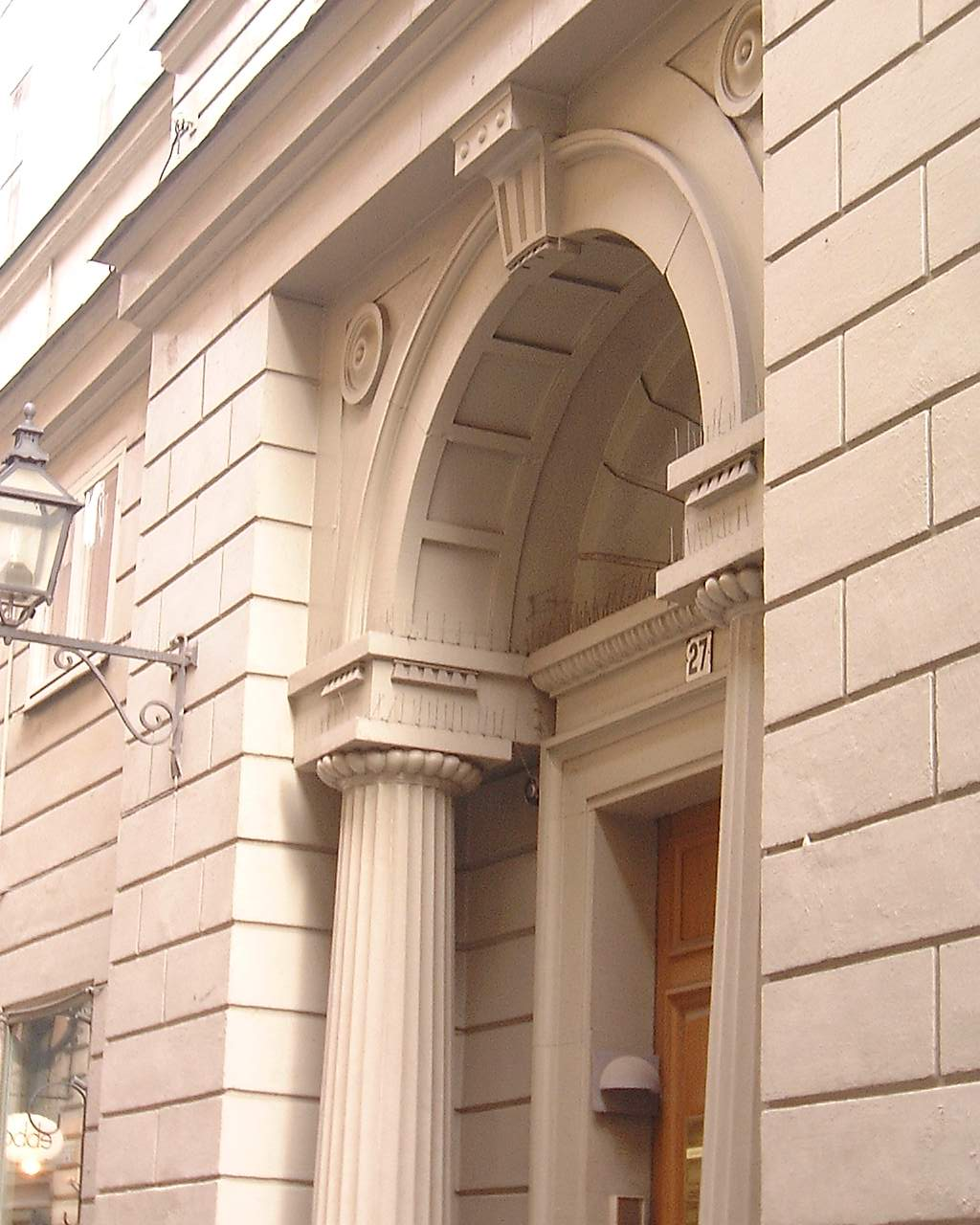
Portal on Number 27.

On Number 27 is the House of Palmstedt, the private home of Erik Palmstedt, the great architect of the closing 18th century. Designed in 1801, but still uncompleted by the time for his death two years later, the façade reflects the architect's late reduced style, lighter than the Custom House at Skeppsbron but tighter than the Stock Exchange at Stortorget. Still preserved are the cast iron columns and the archivolt of the portico, and the pilasters and vaults of the entrance and staircase. On the right side is a boundary plate displaying the coat of arms of the provinces Uppland and Södermanland, the message of which, UPLANDz och SUDERMANNALANDz SKILLNAD ("Uppland's and Södermanland's difference"), is often misinterpreted as indicating the delimitation of the two provinces, but is only informing of an old border between two historical dioceses.

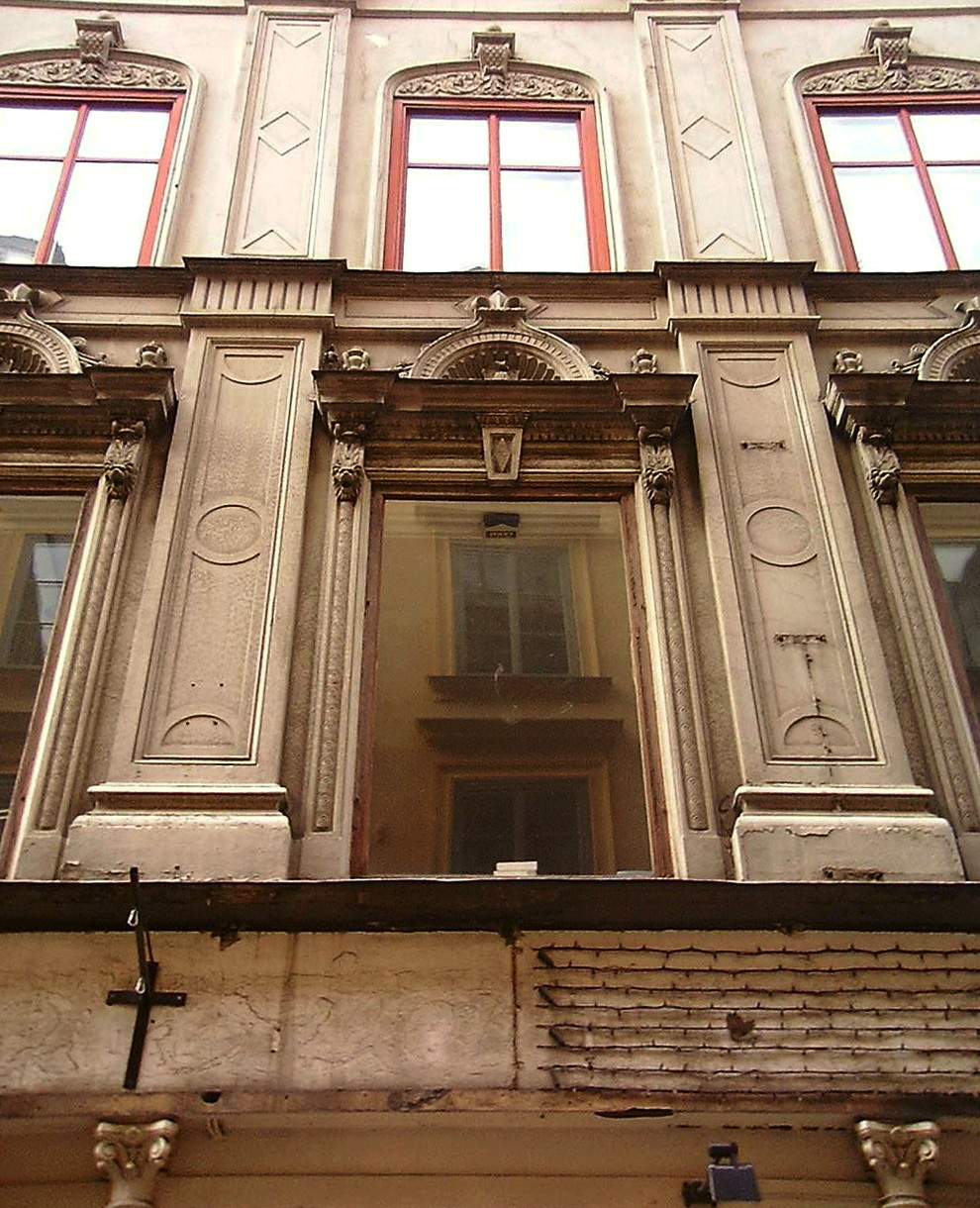
Front of number 28.

The present 19th century façade of Number 28 conceals the former residence of Jöran Persson (1530–1568), the Machiavellian advisor of King Eric XIV, who used his influence well and owned a series of buildings in the city, including Number 30. He was removed and his estates confiscated following the death of the king. On either side of the building are the alleys Sven Vintappares Gränd and Didrik Ficks Gränd, the former named after the wine-tapper of the king and the latter named after a German tenant, Didrich Fischer, in a property owned by the son of Jöran Persson, Erik Jöransson Tegel.

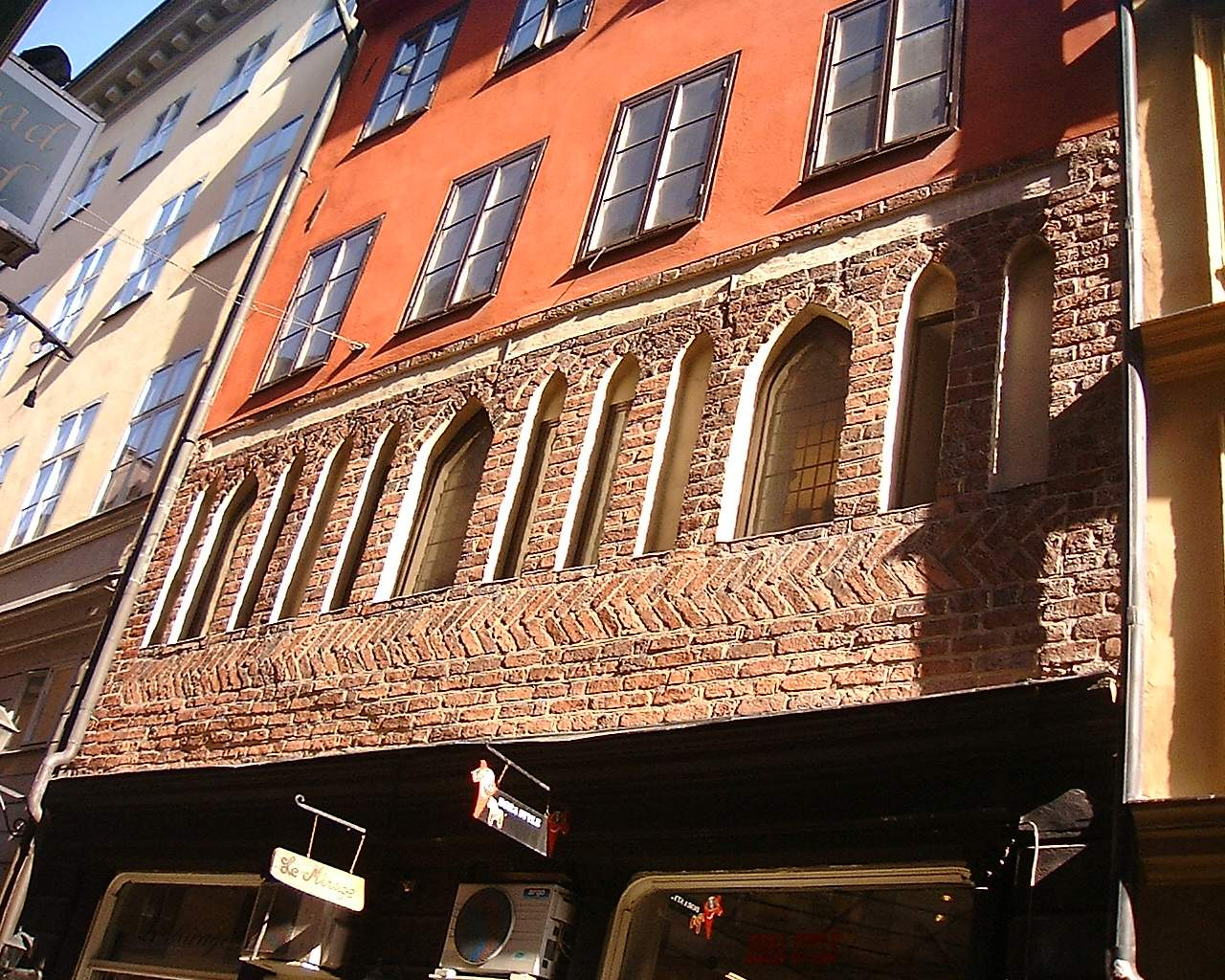
Medieval brick wall of Number 29.

During a restoration in 1946, a medieval bricked wall was discovered on Number 29, today exposed over the shop windows. The eleven pointed arches and the bricked herringbone pattern, dates back to the 14th century, while the glazed window are later additions — the first glazier in Stockholm is mentioned in 1421 and glass was still luxury at the time, so these windows were shut using wooden shutters, some rays of light possibly passing in through scraped leather or panes of bones. The cast iron columns on street-level are from the 19th century.

On Number 37 was the home of Olof Palme, former PM assassinated in 1986, and unconfirmed reports have it his murderer was seen lurking in the street shortly before the assassination. On the opposite side is the vault leading to Yxsmedsgränd, a name literally meaning "Axe Blacksmith's Alley" but probably a corruption of the name Yskeme owned by a man living in the alley and possibly of Estonian or Finnish origin.

=== Kåkbrinken-Tyska Brinken ===
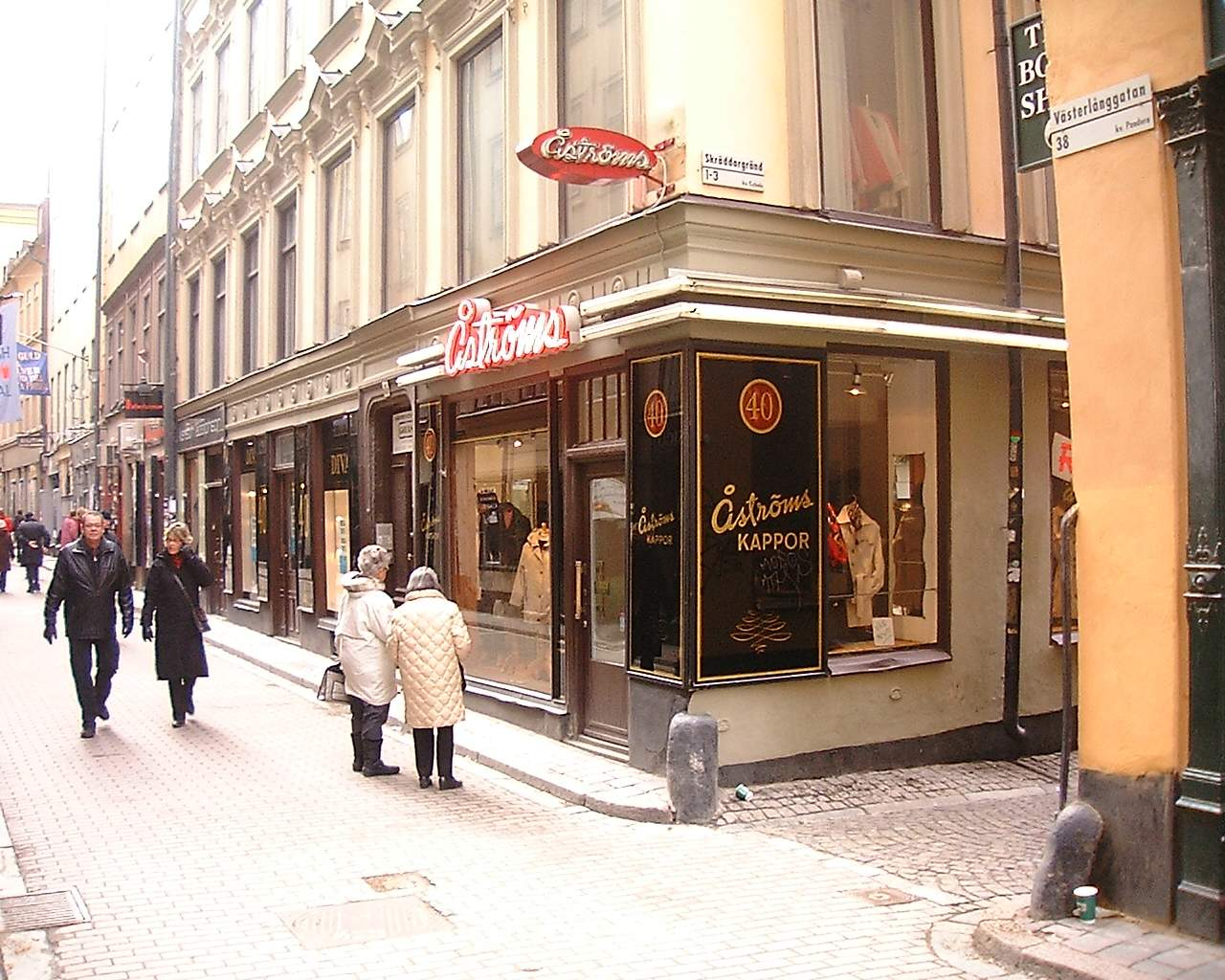
Number 40.

There used to be dozens of coat shops in central Stockholm, but today only two remain, one of which is located on Number 40, Åströms Kappaffär. The shop was founded in 1911, and the current owner, Eva Sjölund, has been working there since 1979, just like her mother and grandmother.

On the address was the milliner's shop of Carolina Lindström, founded in 1842 and during many years the oldest in town. She was arguably one of the most enterprising women in the city, the habit of working late at night giving her the nick "The Evening Star" and, in 1844, she became rich as she got to know about the death of King Charles XIV before her competitors and bought all the crapes and other mourning clothes in the city. She even survived her husband, a gambling spice trader who nearly bankrupted the family, and pursued her business for 50 years until her death.

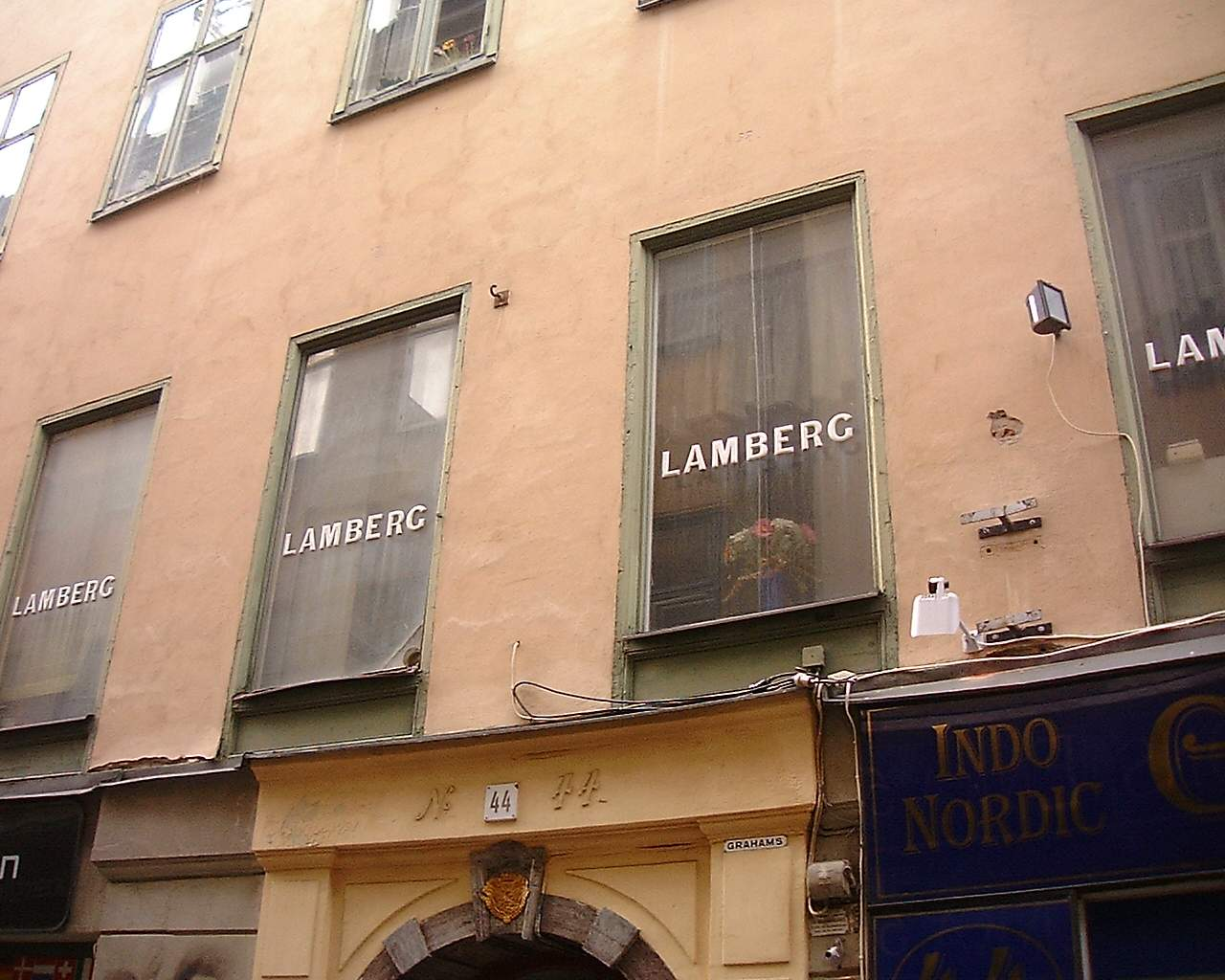
Number 44.

Johan Hoghusen, a wine trader who immigrated from Westphalia in 1620, lived on Number 44, just as did his son and namesake who was raised to peerage and appointed county governor, and for several centuries the building continued to be leavened by the smells of liquor. The milliner's shop Lamberg, founded in 1877 by the then 21 years old Augusta Lamberg from Gothenburg, was located over the punch manufacture of J G Grönstedt in the basement, and, as the story goes, the vapours from the latter attracted customers to the former. The building was redesigned in the 18th century in the Rococo manners of J W Dinling, the rounded corners of which are still found in the courtyard and on the first floor.

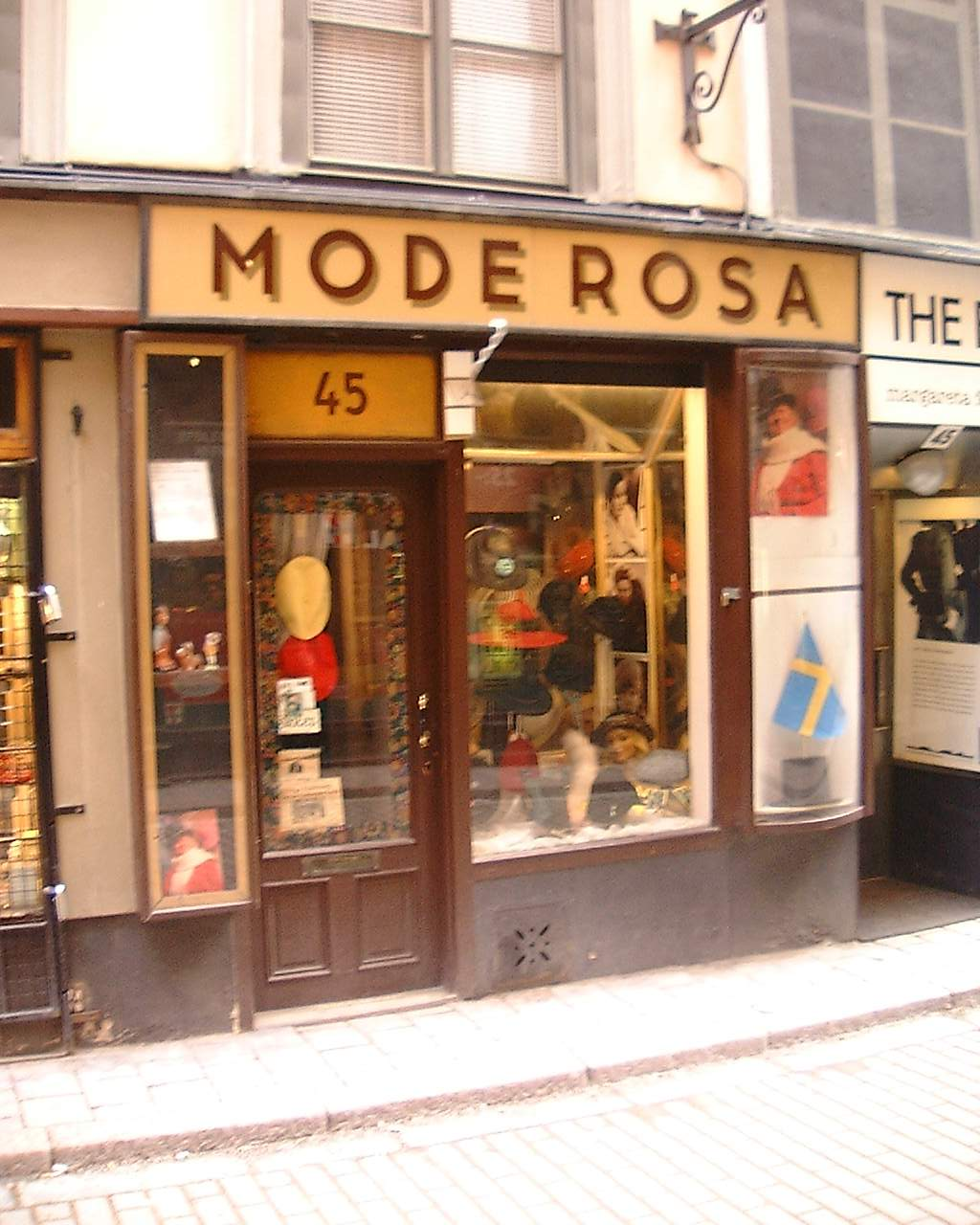
Number 45.

Number 45 are two merged building situated over large medieval cellars. For more than a hundred years, the glove factory of Carl Malmberg, founded in 1877, was located on this address, as a royal purveyor delivering the kid gloves required at the balls at the Royal Palace.

In what was the southern building, the wine dealer Mårten Hartman opened the tavern Källaren Rostock in 1643, an establishment much later featuring in the 45th epistle of Carl Michael Bellman. It retells the story of how Corporal Mollberg while attending the tavern got into trouble for playing the reel (called polska in Swedish, e.g. "a polish") of the Queen of Poland, and thus stirred up the temper of the gentlemen around him because of the disputed partition of Poland.

Tjänare, Mollberg, hur är det fatt?	Howdy, Mollberg, what's up?
Var är din harpa, var är din hatt?	Where is your harp, where is your hat?
Ack, hur din läpp är kluven och stor!	Oh, how you lip is split and puffed!
Var har du varit? Svara, min bror!	Where have you been? Answer, my brother!
Till Rostock, min far,	To Rostock, old man,
Min harpa jag bar.	My harp I bore.
Där börjades krakel	There begun a brawl
om mig och mitt spel	about me and my play
och bäst jag spelte — pling plingeli plång	and whilst I played — tinkle tinkely tang
kom en skoflickare, hjulbent och lång	came a shoe patcher, bow-legged and long
högg mig på truten. .. Pling plingeli plång!	blew me on the chaps. .. Tinkle tinkery tang!
[...]	[...]
Nu satt i vrån en gammal sergeant,	Now, in the nook sat an old sergeant,
Tvenne notarier och en ståndsdrabant;	two notaries and a ranked royal bodyguard;
de ropa: slå! skoflickarn har rätt,	they cried: beat! the shoe patcher is right,
Polen är straffat, dess öde utmätt.	Poland is punished, its faith levied
Ur skrubben kom fram	Out of the closet stepped forward
en vindögd madam,	a squint-eyed madam
slog harpan i kras	smashed the harp to pieces
med flaskor och glas.	with bottles and glasses.
Skoflickaren högg mig, pling plingeli plång,	The shoe patcher slashed me, tinkle tinkery tang,
bak uti nacken en skårsa så lång.	back in the neck a score so long.
Där har ni saken. Pling plingeli plång.	That's the story. Tinkle tinkery tang.

The café on Number 49 boasts an interior dating back to the 14th century.

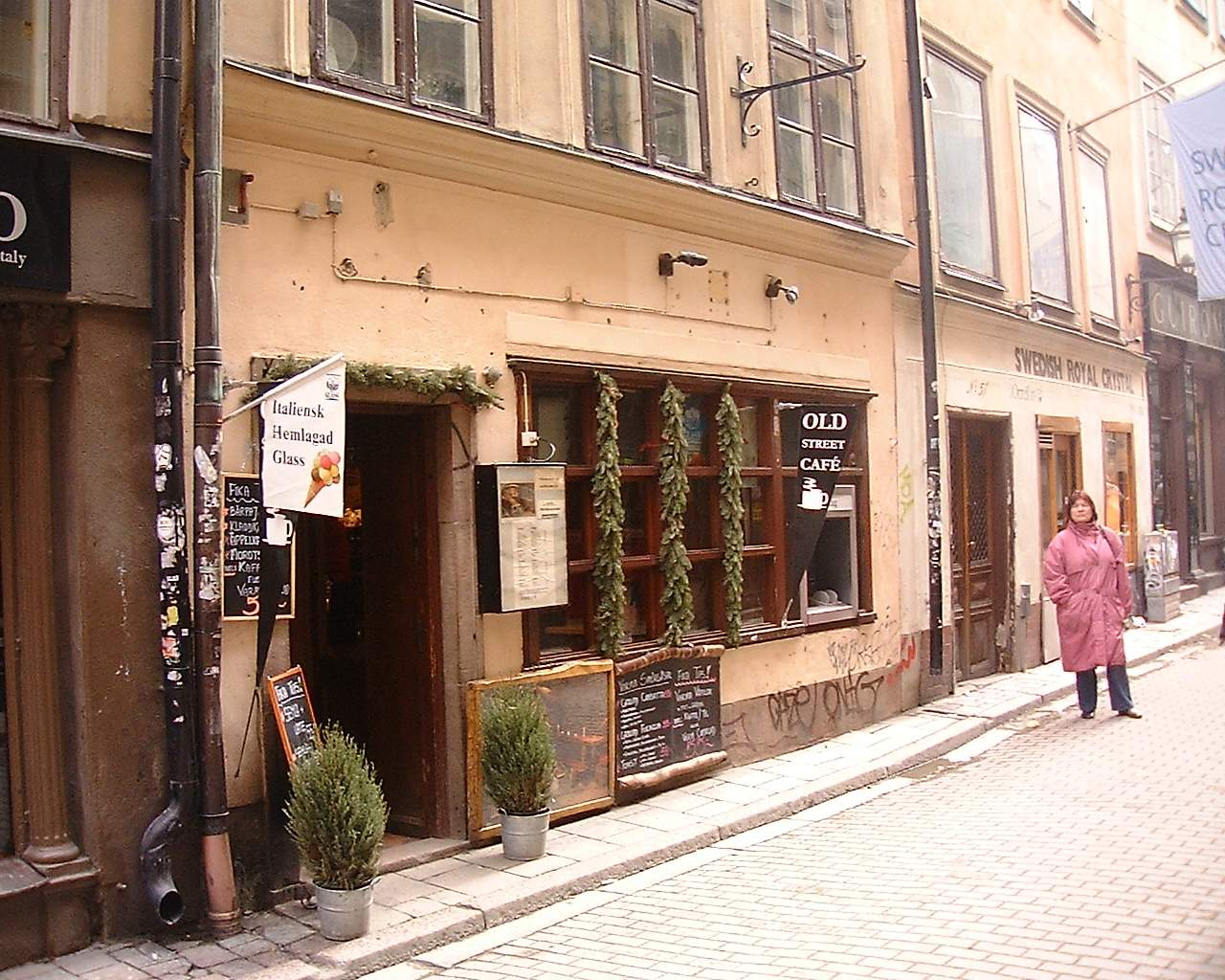
Number 49.

The building is a brilliant example of primitive construction works could be during the Middle Ages — the bricked walls of the interior are the gables of the neighbouring buildings, still displaying what once was the doors and windows facing the then unbuilt lot — the proprietor simply built a façade towards the street and added a roof. On the backside are blocks of granite, probably part of the medieval wall that passed through the present block. On the second floor are ceilings and flooring from the 17th century, and in the basement a medieval cobbled stone floor.

=== Tyska Brinken-Järntorget ===
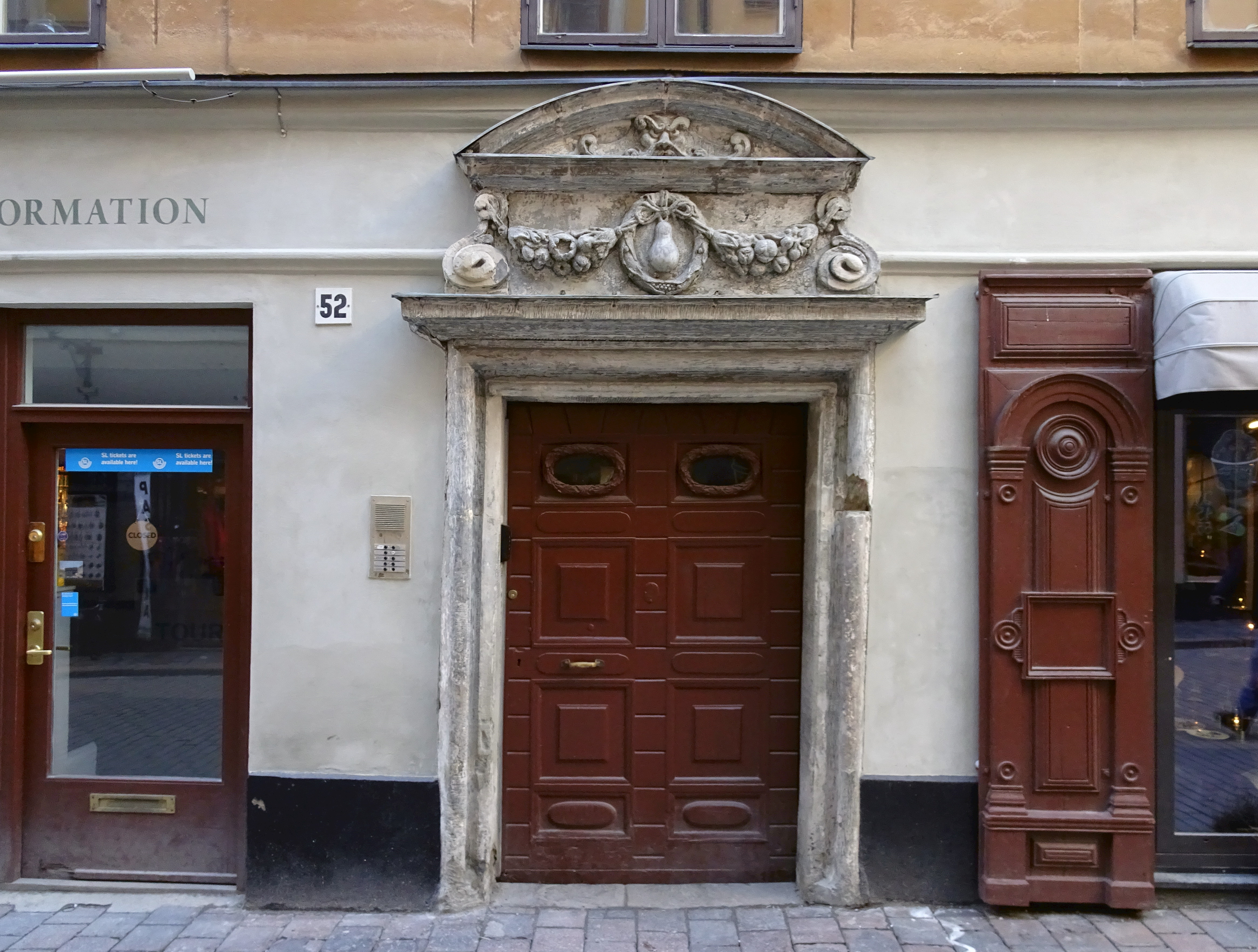
Portal of Number 52.

Number 52 was called Sidenhuset Pärlan ("silk house the Pearl") and the portal still features the pear-shaped pearl over the front door which was the owner's mark of the silk trader Henric Meurman. He created a small-ware shop in the 1660s, decorating the portal with fruit garlands and a bow resembling those on the House of Knights, following a common practice for burghers to copy decorations found on prominent palaces.

The current building on Number 54 was, according to an inscription on the portal, completed in 1662, but parts of the building are considerably older, the first owner, a Diedrik Skekerman from Lübeck, appearing in historical records as a lodger and innkeeper in 1589–1597. The portal is made of red limestone and possibly designed by Nicodemus Tessin the Elder. In the basement of the building, five metres under street level, a sealed round arched tunnel have been found, thought to have led under Västerlånggatan to Prästgatan and to have been built as an escape route in case the Danes would take the city. One of the oldest second-hand bookshops in Sweden, Aspingtons Antikvariat, was located here 1978–2001. The building is today owned by the trade union for the employees of the Customs and Coastguard (Tull-Kust).

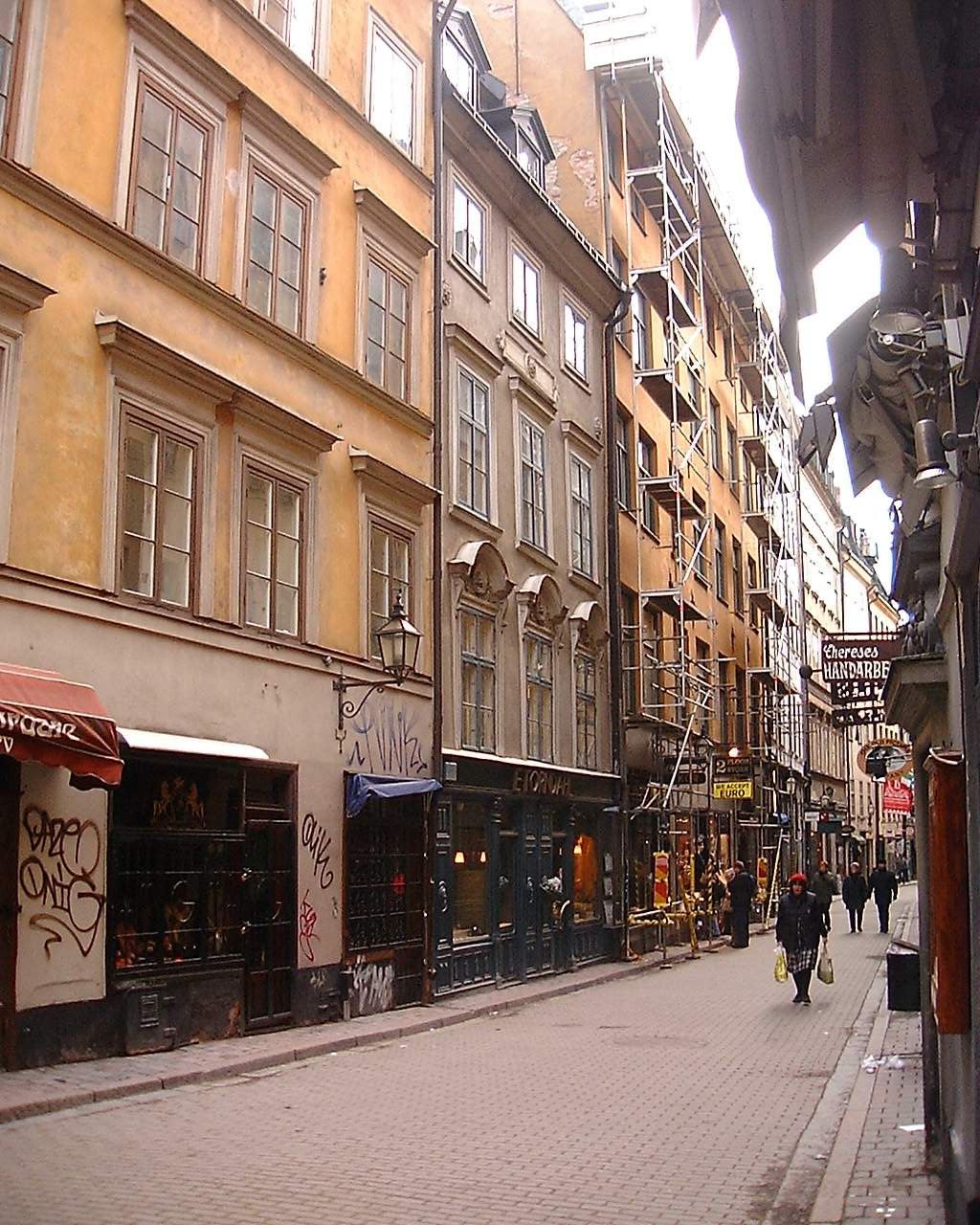
Number 63.

Number 63, including its Neo-Rococo ornaments and green shutters, is the family heirloom of the Torndahls. The building was bought by the goldsmith Per Gustaf Torndahl in the mid 19th century and his shop was continued by his widow, Ida Tekla Sabina Cunigunda who also added the ornaments. The grandchildren of Gustaf and Ida are still carefully minding the building and operating the handicraft shop still present on the address.

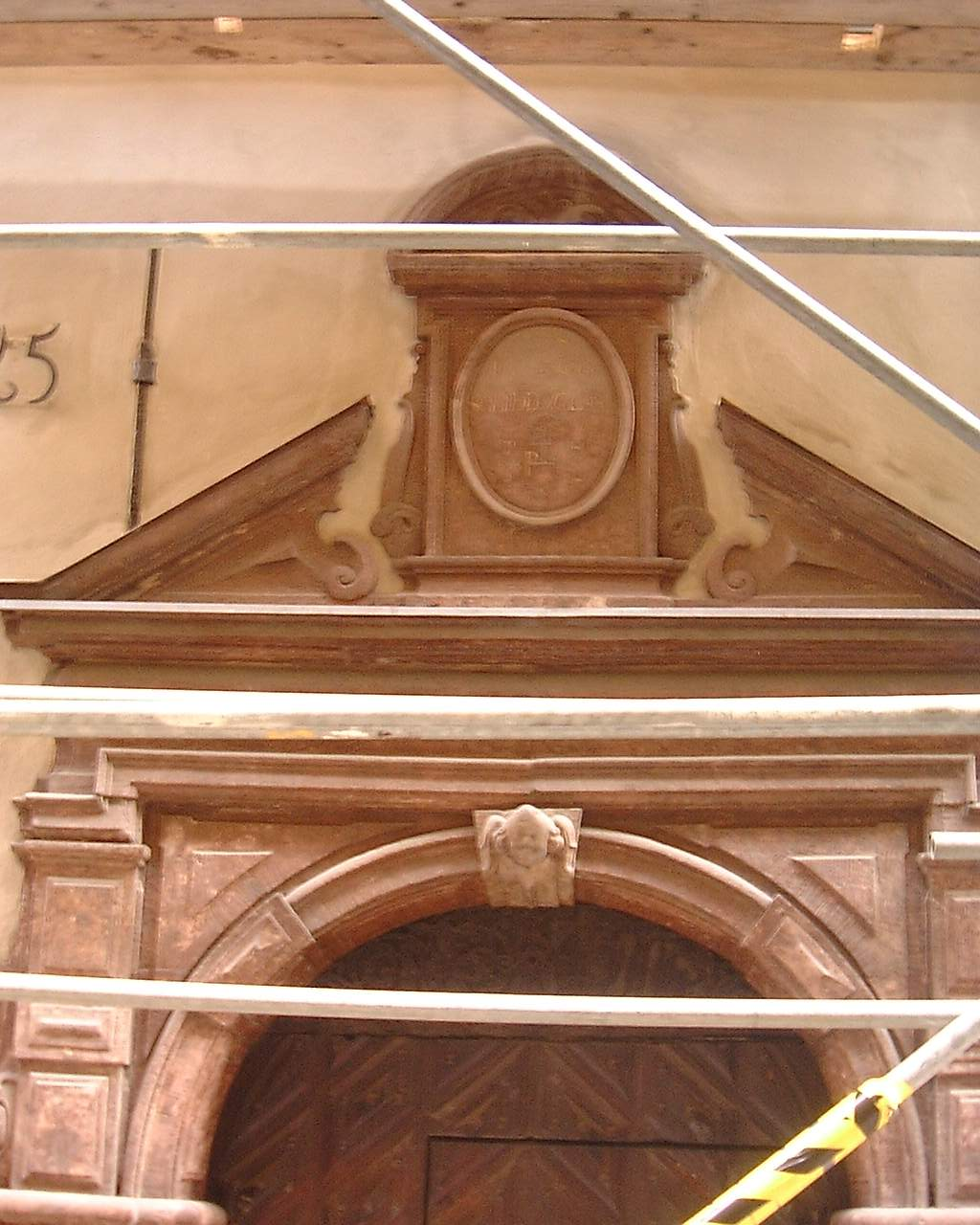
Number 65.

Barely visible in the red sandstone cartouche of the portal of Number 65 is a Christogram, IHS, the maxim SOLI DEI GLORIA ("To God alone the glory"), and the initials of the Holstein cloth trader Peter Hanssen and his wife Anna Steker:

P	H
A	H
S

The couple, which restored the building during the 1660s, were very rich and, among other things, donated the pulpit still found in the German Church.

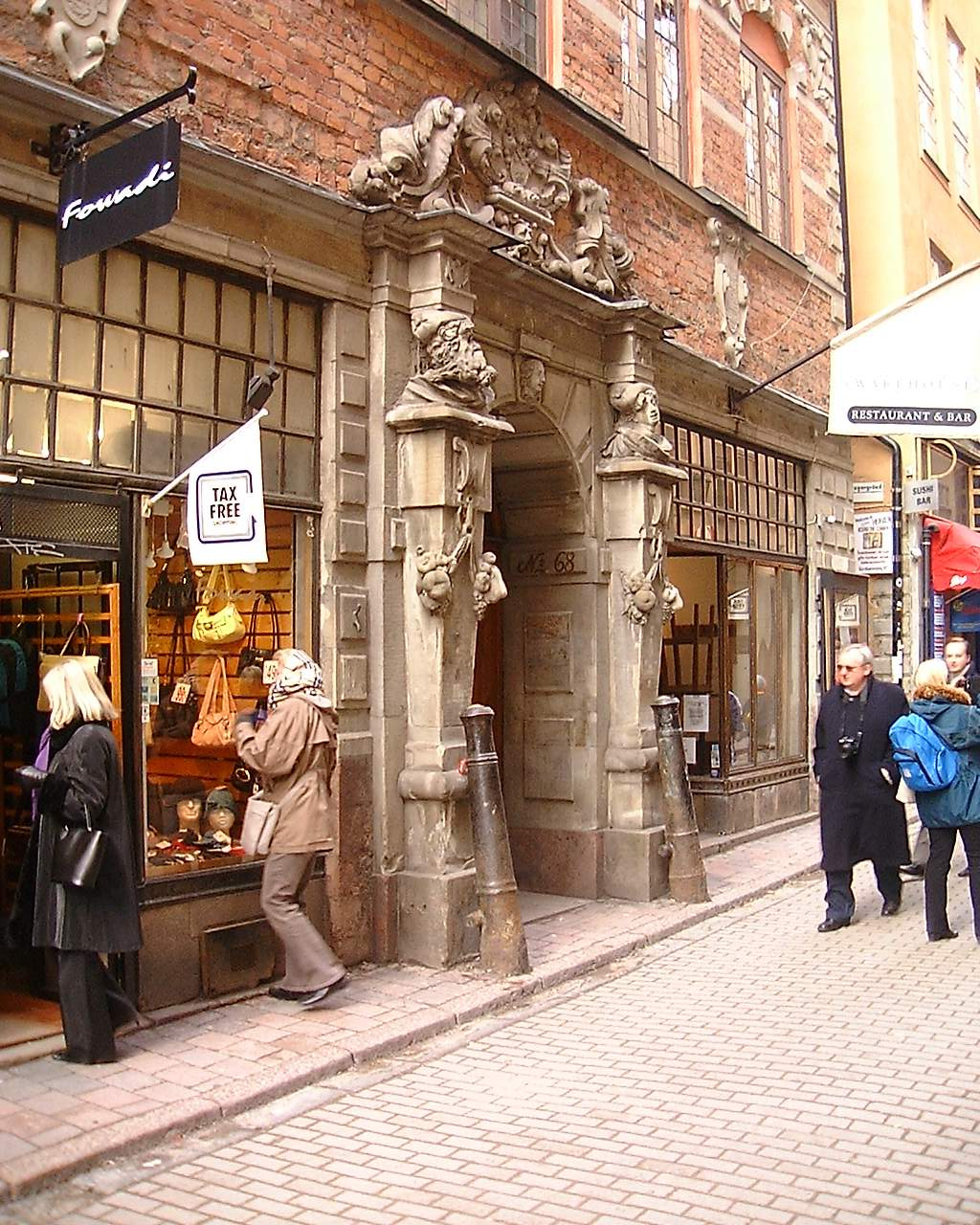
Number 68.

Number 68, the so-called von der Linde House was built by Erik Larsson in 1633. He had made a fortune exporting Swedish iron and importing wine and, serving as an economical advisor to King Gustavus II Adolphus, was eventually raised to peerage under the name von der Linde. The bared brick wall of the Dutch Renaissance façade is richly decorated with sandstone ornaments cut by Aris Claesz from Haarlem, including the sumptuous portal. The two heads in the portico symbolizes Mercury and Neptune and in the arms of Erik Larsson are two linden which he planted on his homestead at Lovön. Flanking the portal are two cartouches displaying inscriptions in German:

AVF• / GOTT•AL / LEIN• / SETZ•DIE / HOFNVNG / DEIN
To god alone put the hope of yours.
AN / GOTTES / SEGEN / IST• / ALLES / GELEGEN
On God's blessing is all depending

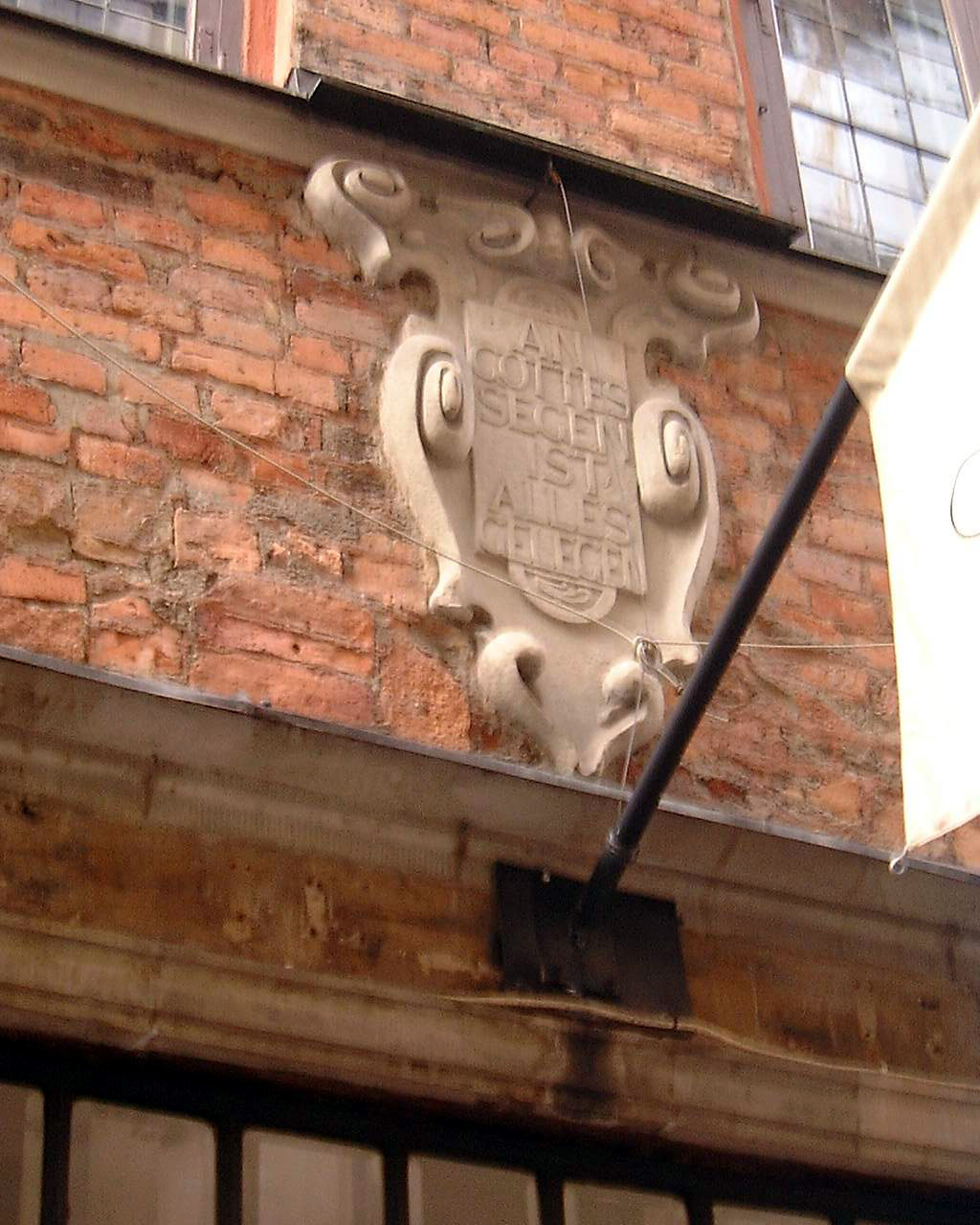
Right escutcheon on Number 68.

The property was later bought by Queen Christina to her half-brother, Gustav, Count of Vasaborg, the illegitimate child of Gustavus Adolphus, who had a wing added facing the square on opposite side of block. The names of all proprietors, historical and present, are engraved on a slate behind the front door, a list ending with the Masonry Master's Guild (Murmestare Embetet i Stockholm), founded in the old town in 1487, and today using the building for their extensive archive. One of the inhabitants was Pierre Chanut and his guest René Descartes. Two of the old proprietors have given their names to establishment residing in the building; the former confectioner Drottning Kristina facing the street and the banqueting rooms von der Lindeska valven in the basement

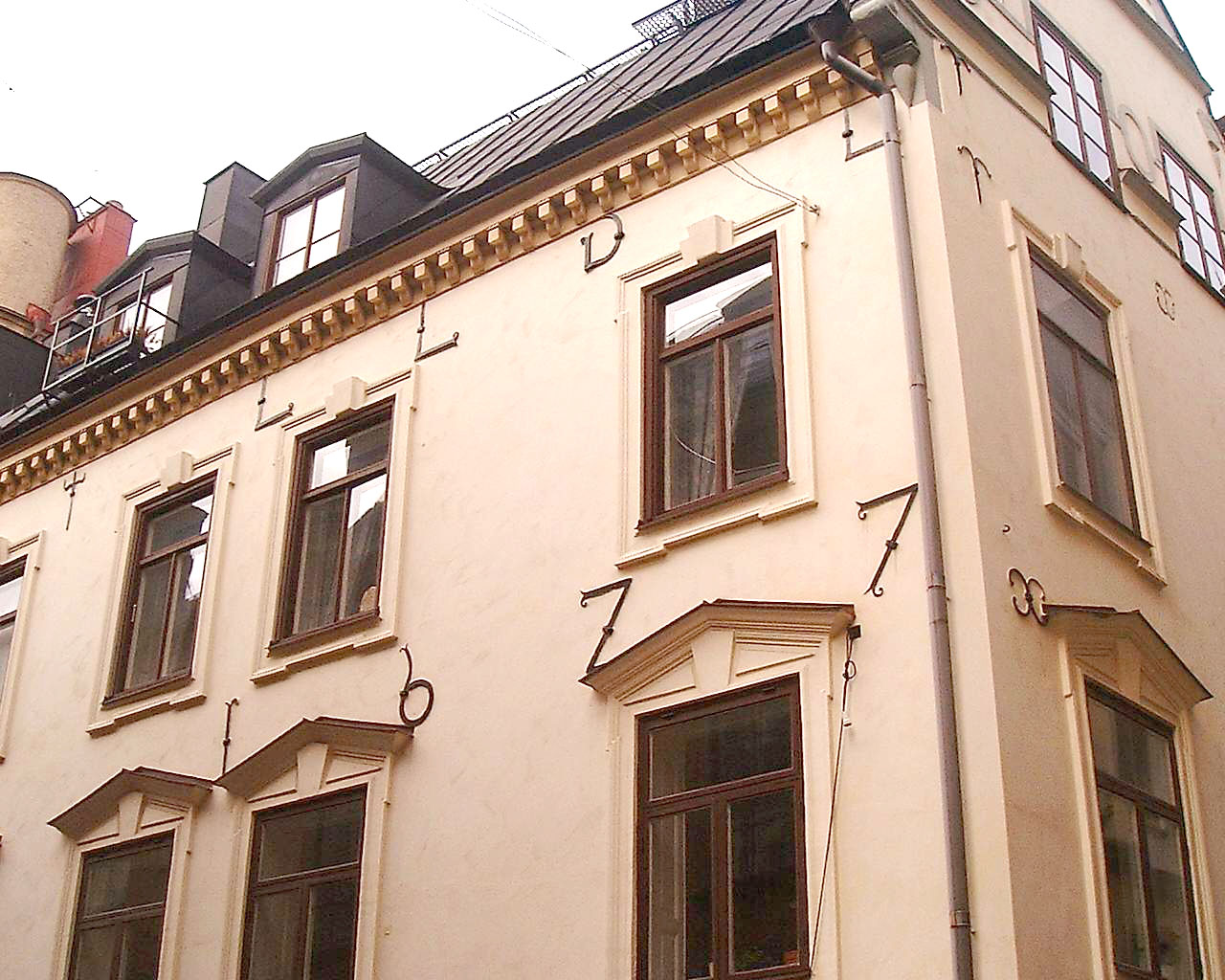
Number 70.

Number 70 is a medieval building but the exterior was created in the early 17th century. On the front facing Funckens Gränd are the initials of former owners: L L D L 1627, Lydert Lang and Dorotea Lang. The present building on Number 72–74 is a product of the merging of two older buildings during the 20th century. In medieval times, these two buildings were separated by an alley of which remains a narrow and elongated backyard passing through the block. Various properties in the block have been merged and partitioned repeatedly over several centuries, and though virtually all traces of the medieval neighbourhood are gone, the present façade is decorated with bits and pieces of older buildings; placed in niches in the 1930s when the present shop front was built. The trader Thomas Funck owned most of the buildings in the neighbourhood in the 17th century, why he gave the alley its name. Number 76, mentioned together with the property on the opposite side of the block as "both buildings of late Funck", probably referring to one of the sons of the former. A medieval alley once passed through the building on Number 78, and the present building is partly from the early 17th century, while the shop windows and the attic were rebuilt in the 20th century.

On Number 79 is the restaurant Mårten Trotzig, named after Mårten Trotzigs Gränd, the narrowest alley in the old town passing next to it, in its turn named after the merchant Mårten Trotzig (1559–1617) who owned a building in the alley. In the restaurant is an excavated medieval refuse chute once accessed through an exterior door.

The Danish King Christian II entered Stockholm on September 7, 1520, following the surrender of Christina Gyllenstierna, the widow queen of Sten Sture the Younger, and became king of Sweden on November 1, as such he choose not to occupy the Royal Palace, but to stay with the German merchant Gorius Holst who lived in this building during the week preceding the Stockholm Bloodbath.

Much of the present block was created by the secretary of King Eric XIV, Erik Göransson Tegel, who married Margareta Dantzeville, the widow of Reinhold Leuhusen who owned a building here. Tegel, mostly remembered for having written history books but who had more than one string to his bow and also worked as a spy in Denmark and Poland, started to buy neighbouring properties in order to enlarge his home, which gave the entire block a common history. An archaeological excavation in 1992 unveiled a wall and a vault in the backyard of the block. The painter Carl Larsson was born here in 1853. While he today cherished for his watercolours of bright and colourful idyllic family sceneries, his gloomy childhood in the old town, caused him to live his life with melancholy constantly at hand.

The numbers of Västerlånggatan are continuous with those of Järntorget, so the addresses on the square are numbered 81–85 on the north side, and 78–84 on the southern.

== Gallery ==
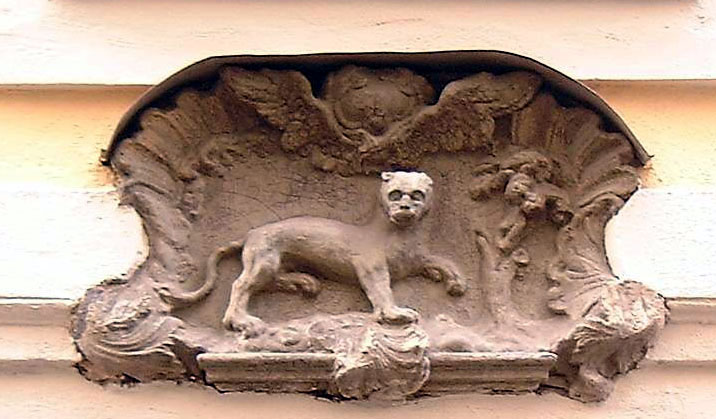
Nr. 24, Northern frieze.

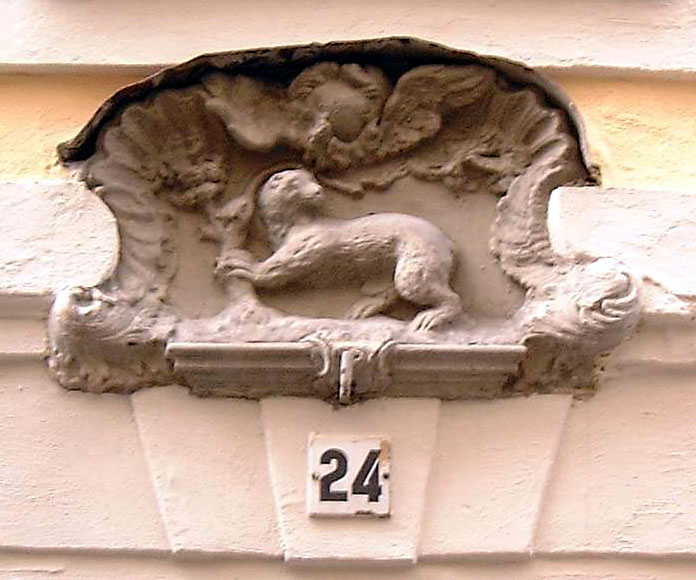
Nr. 24, Southern frieze.

== See also ==
- Österlånggatan
- List of streets and squares in Gamla Stan
