= Stenbastugränd =

Alley in Gamla stan, Stockholm, Sweden

Coordinates: 59°19′33.50″N 18°04′06.50″E

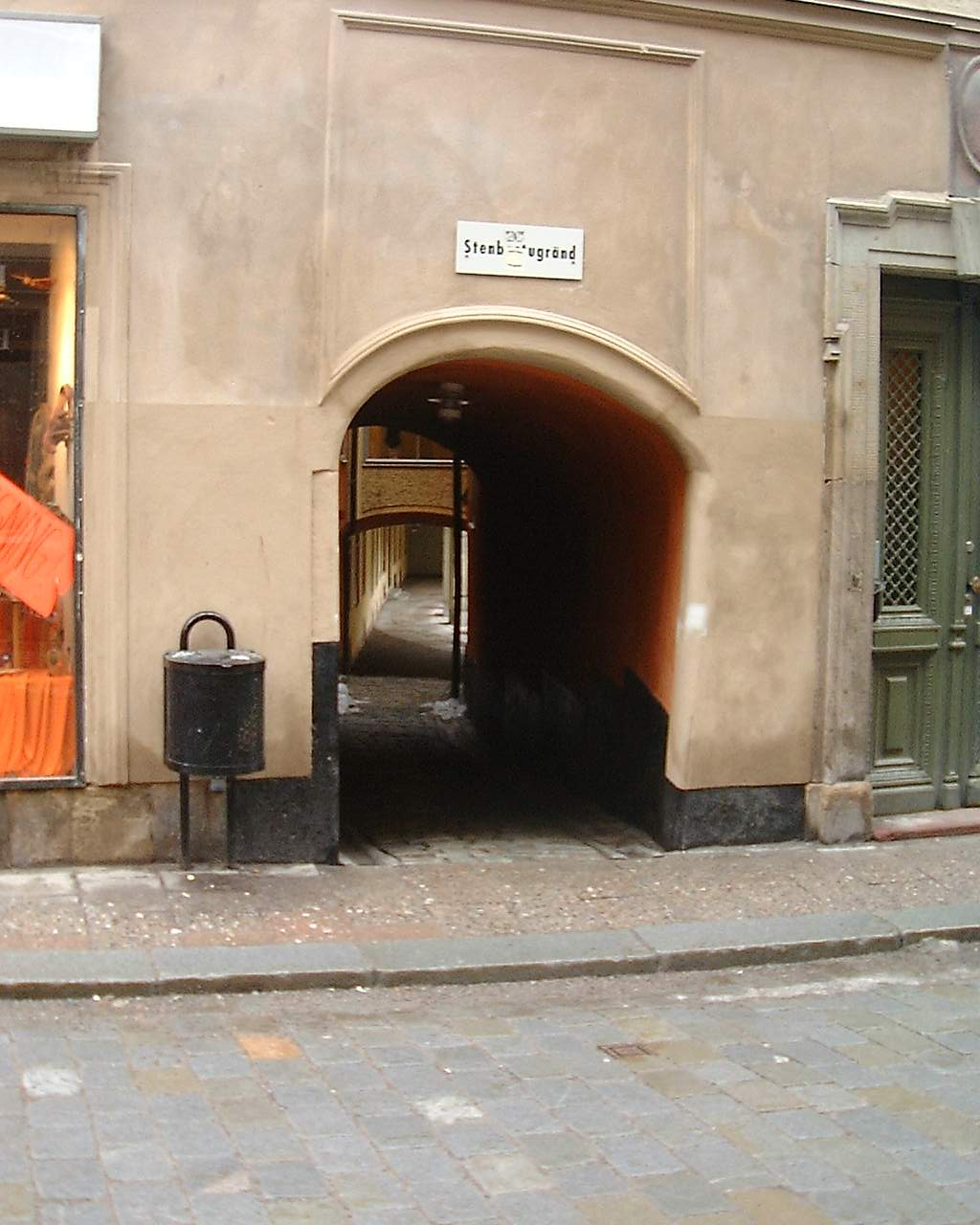
Stenbastugränd in March 2007.

Stenbastugränd is a small alley in Gamla stan, the old town in central Stockholm, Sweden. Connecting Västerlånggatan to the square Brantingtorget, it forms a parallel street to Kolmätargränd and Storkyrkobrinken.

The present name of the alley first appears in historical records in 1440 as stenbadzstufwo grændinne, thus referring to the city's stone sauna located in the alley. As early as 1515, however, the alley was called Wruaders gränd in references to Nils Månsson Urväder who bought a brewery there in 1485. The latter name was used until 1925, when the alley was given back its old name in order to avoid confusion with the street on Södermalm also called Urvädergränd. The alley used to stretch through the present block all the way to Myntgatan on the opposite side. As a consequence of the enlargement of Kanslihuset ("The Chancellery House") during World War II, which resulted in Kanslihusannexet ("The Chancellery Annex") and its circular courtyard (Brantingtorget), the alley was transformed into the short tunnel it is today.

== See also ==
- List of streets and squares in Gamla stan
