= Carolina Lindström =

Swedish milliner

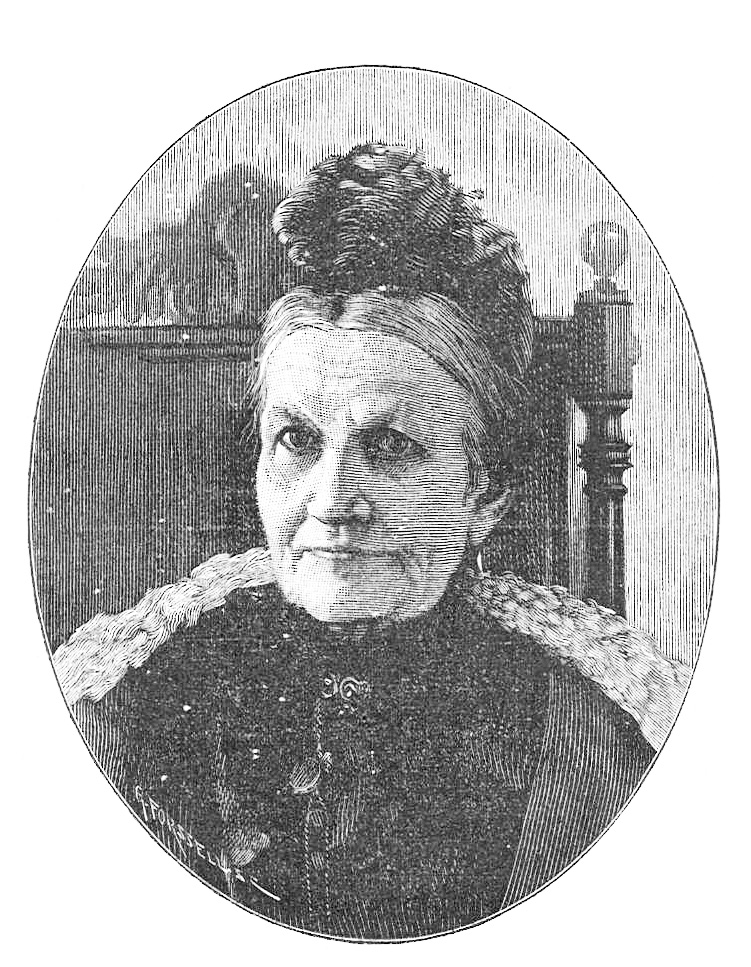
Carolina Lindström, woodcut by Gunnar Forssell

Carolina Lindström, née Lundström (1812–1892), was a Swedish milliner. She was known in Stockholm as "Evening Star", because she was often seen working during the night.

== Life ==
Her mother was a business woman and she herself saved her money until she could afford to become an apprentice to the top hat maker in Stockholm, a French woman.

Lindström had her own shop at Västerlånggatan 40 in 1842. She had a large web of contacts; at the death of the king in 1844, she was alerted by the footmen at the royal palace so that she was able to acquire all the black mourning ribbons from the other milliners in the capital before the death had been publicly known. She was very successful and opened a second shop at Hornsgatan. In 1847, she married a man who squandered all her money on gambling, but she quickly recouped it.

In 1892, she left her business to one of her assistants and bought a place for herself at the Stockholm retirement home for merchant widows; however, she died a couple of months after her retirement.

Her boutique was, in 1995, the oldest fashion shop in Stockholm.

== See also ==
- Anna Maria Thalén
- Augusta Lundin
