= Anna Maria Thalén =

Swedish fashion trader (1781–1851)

Anna Maria Thalén (1781-1851) was a Swedish fashion trader. She belonged to the leading in her profession in early 19th-century Stockholm and are mentioned in contemporary memoirs and diary literature.

Anna Maria Thalén was married to the candle manufacturer Vilhelm Casper Thalén. She is referred to as "Fashion maker or Fashion trader", milliner and trader of accessories. Officially, she sold accessories and a number of fashion items such as shawls and feathers, repaired, remade and washed such items, and provided her clients with the names of seamstresses and other fashion workers with whom she worked. This profession was a result of the fact that seamstresses worked in a grey zone prior to the abolition of the guilds in 1846 and formally only allowed to repair and remake old clothes so as not to intrude upon the taylors' guild privilege, while in practice, they were both tolerated by the authorities and favored by the clients. In the 1820s, Thalén reportedly managed one of the leading fashion companies in the capital of Stockholm. At that time, Märta Helena Reenstierna belonged to her clients and mentioned the high prices she demanded in her diary.

== See also ==
- Barbara Pauli
- Carolina Lindström
