= Brantingtorget =

Public square in Gamla stan, Stockholm, Sweden

Coordinates: 59°19′33.7″N 18°04′5.1″E

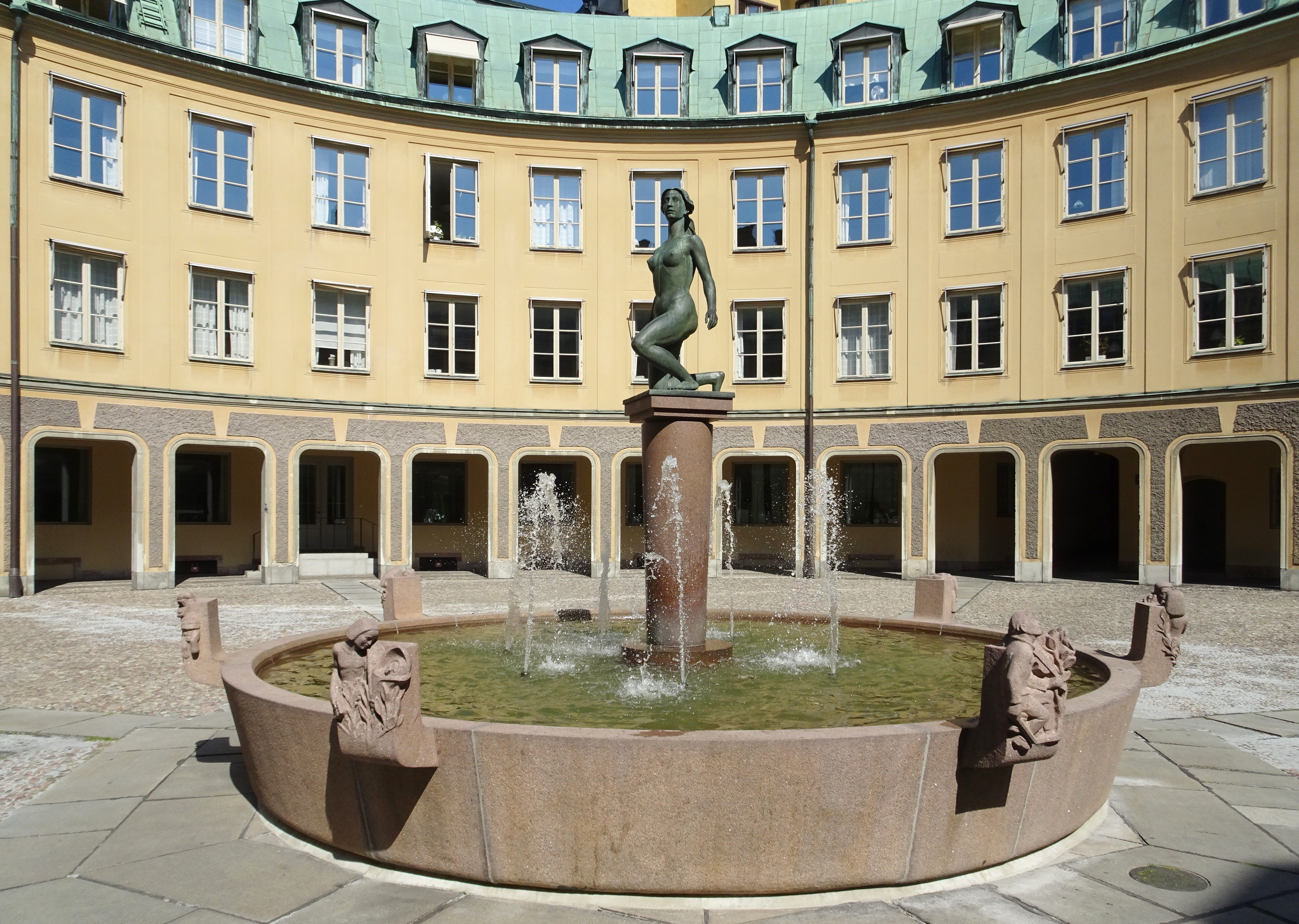
Brantingtorget

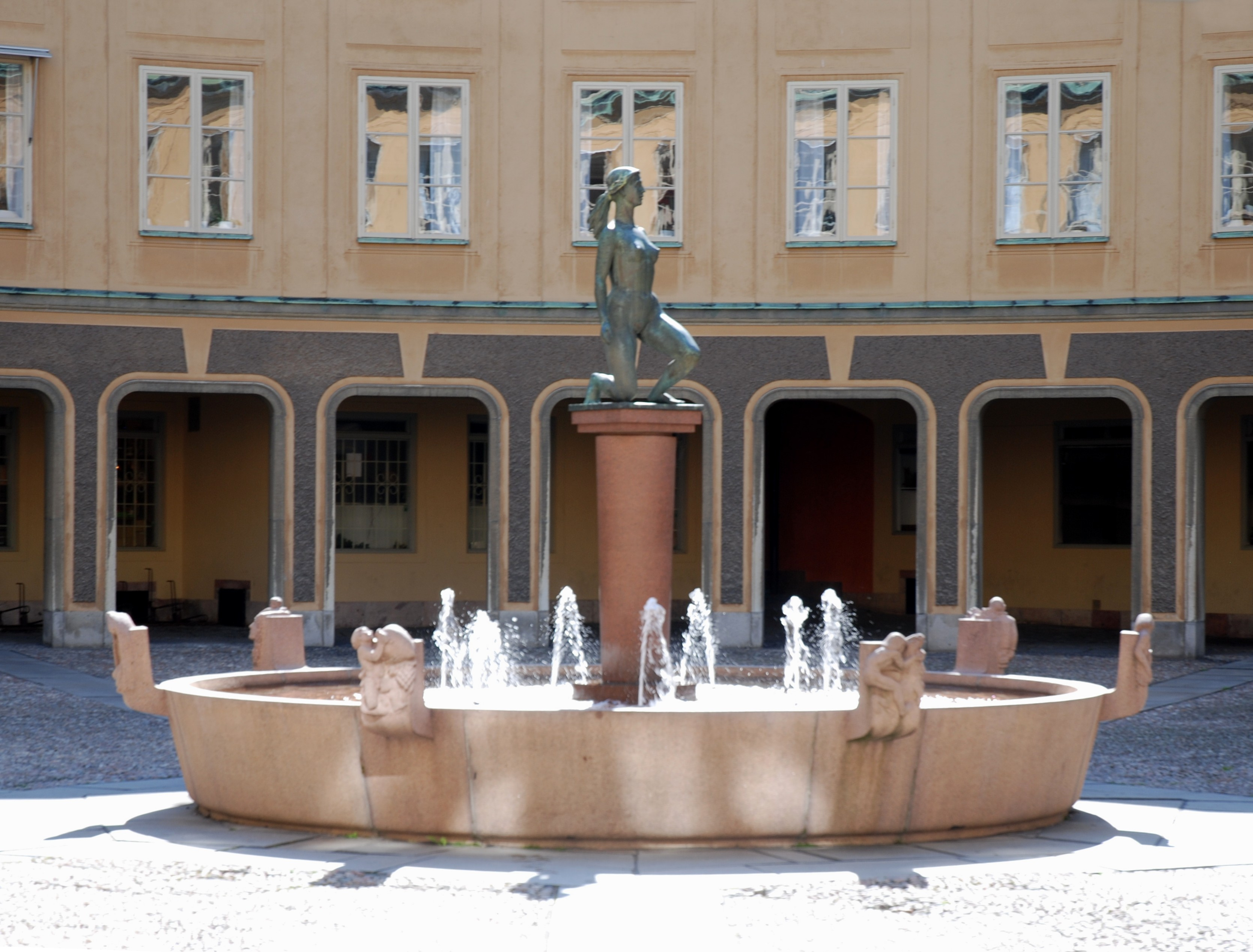
Morgon by Ivar Johnson

Brantingtorget (Swedish: "Square of Branting") is the courtyard of the Chancery House annex (Kanslihusannexet), serving as one of the public squares in Gamla stan, the old town in central Stockholm, Sweden.

== History ==
The square is named after the country's first democratically elected Prime Minister, Hjalmar Branting (1860–1925). It was designed along with the surrounding buildings by the architect Artur von Schmalensee (1900–1972) and built between 1945 and 1950.

It is connected to the surrounding streets by several passages, of which some of which are remnants of alleys once criss-crossing the block – Klockgjutargränd, Kolmätargränd, and Stenbastugränd. The dramatic contrast between the narrow alleys and the relatively large open space they conceal, is astonishingly harmonic, the result of a compromise between the will of antiquaries wanting to preserve the medieval architecture and that of the department wanting to displace what they considered a slum in disrepair. The post-WW2 classicism of the place excited a mode of indignation among other contemporary architects, claiming modern democracy had dressed itself up in a disguise.

Centred on the square is the bronze sculpture Morgon from 1962 by Ivar Johnsson (1885-1970).

== See also ==
- List of streets and squares in Gamla stan
