= Johan Adler Salvius =

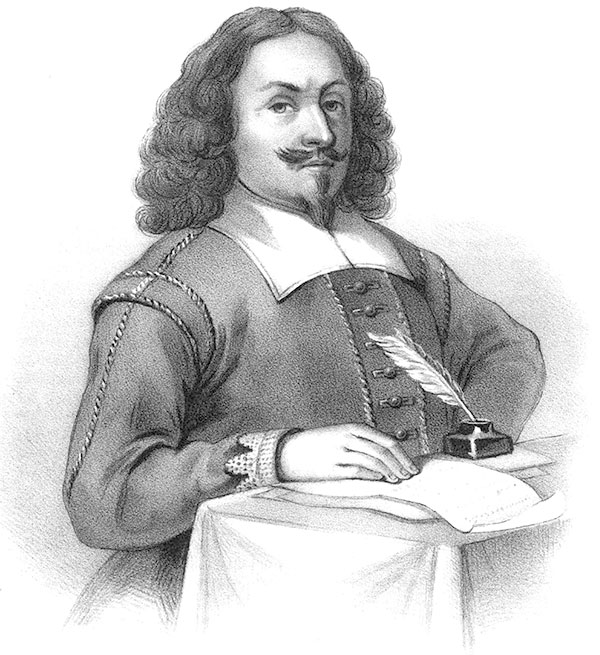
Johan Adler Salvius

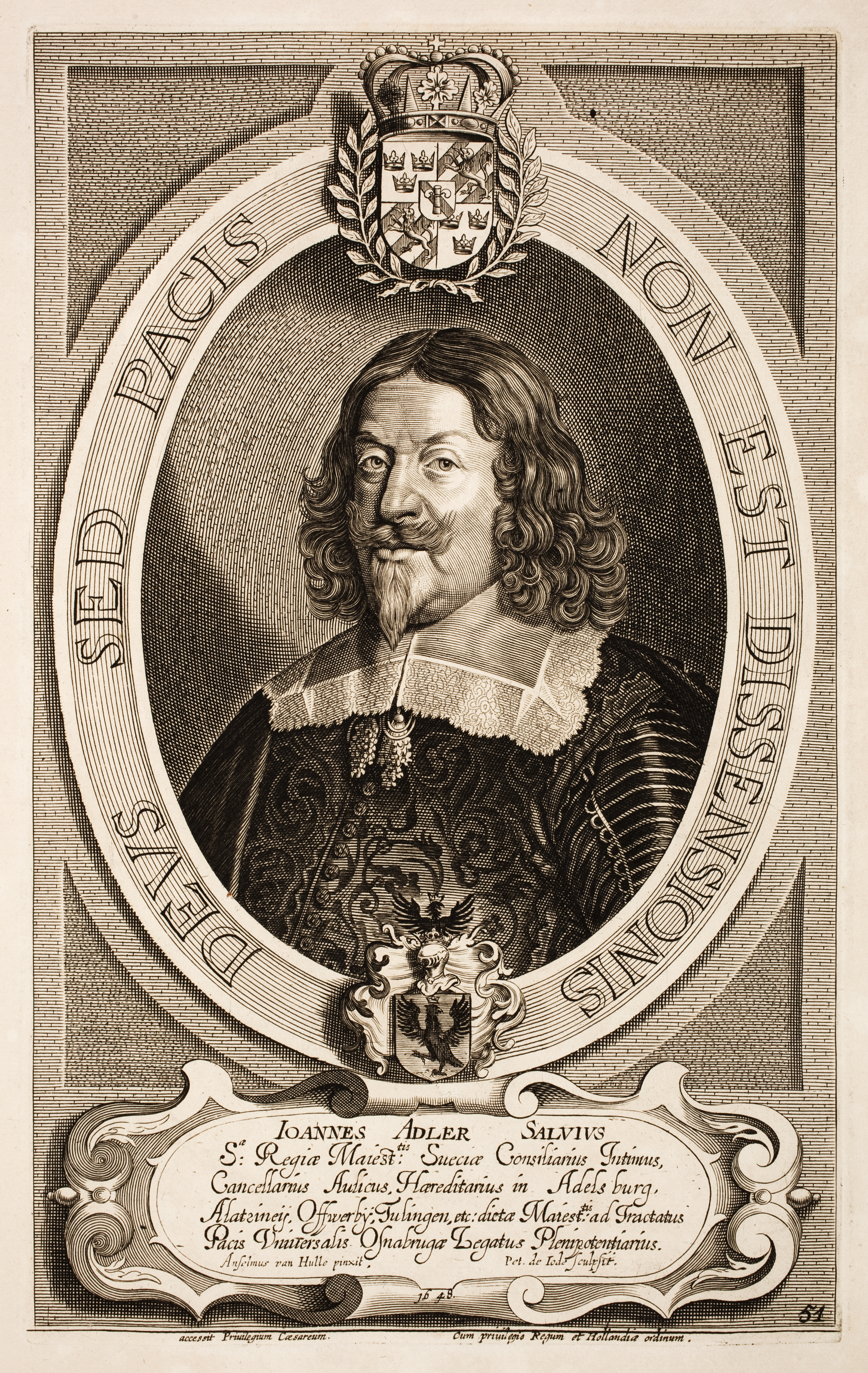
Engraving of Johan Adler Salvius

Johan Adler Salvius (born in 1590 in Strängnäs; died on 24 August 1652 in Stockholm) was a Swedish baron of Örneholm, chancellor, confidant and representative of the Christina, Queen of Sweden at the peace negotiations at Osnabrück and responsible for the Peace of Westphalia. Salvius was, next to Axel Oxenstierna, one of Sweden's most capable and influential diplomats of his time and correspondent of Hugo Grotius.

== Life ==
Salvius was the son of a civil servant. In 1612 he started his studies in Uppsala, but also visited the Protestant universities of Rostock and Helmstedt where he studied philosophy. Then he moved to Marburg where he studied medicine, and to Montpellier where he received a degree in law.

In 1619 he was involved in the transition of Gothenburg into a free port as its first Commissioner. Salvius was appointed baron and in diplomatic service since 1624. He became involved in the military campaigns of Gustavus Adolphus. In 1629, he attended the peace negotiations in Lübeck and wrote the "war manifesto". Gustavus Adolphus sent this propaganda to the emperor of the Holy Roman Empire in 1630?

Salvius resided in Hamburg from 1631 till 1634 as a general war commissioner in Lower Saxony but moved back to Sweden until 1636. For twelve years he was the only Swedish diplomat in Germany. Salvius made a fortune marrying the (much older) widow of a goldsmith who owned several properties in the Salviigränd alley, which was named after him. Apart from his undoubted diplomatic skills, his greed was particularly pronounced.

From 1643 he was preparing the peace negotiations at Osnabrück, as a second man behind Johan Oxenstierna, as Christina wanted peace at any cost, and therefore sent her own delegate. When it became clear Johan Oxenstierna was not capable to fulfill his task neither diplomatic nor mentally, Salvius managed to push through the view of Queen Christina.

In 1648 Salvius considered it “a great miracle that we hear of revolts by the people against their rulers everywhere in the world, for example in France, England, Germany, Poland, Muscovy, and the Ottoman Empire,” and wondered “whether this can be explained by some general configuration of the stars in the sky.” In 1650 he went back to Stockholm.
