= Village Vanguard (Japanese bookstore) =

Book store chain in Japan

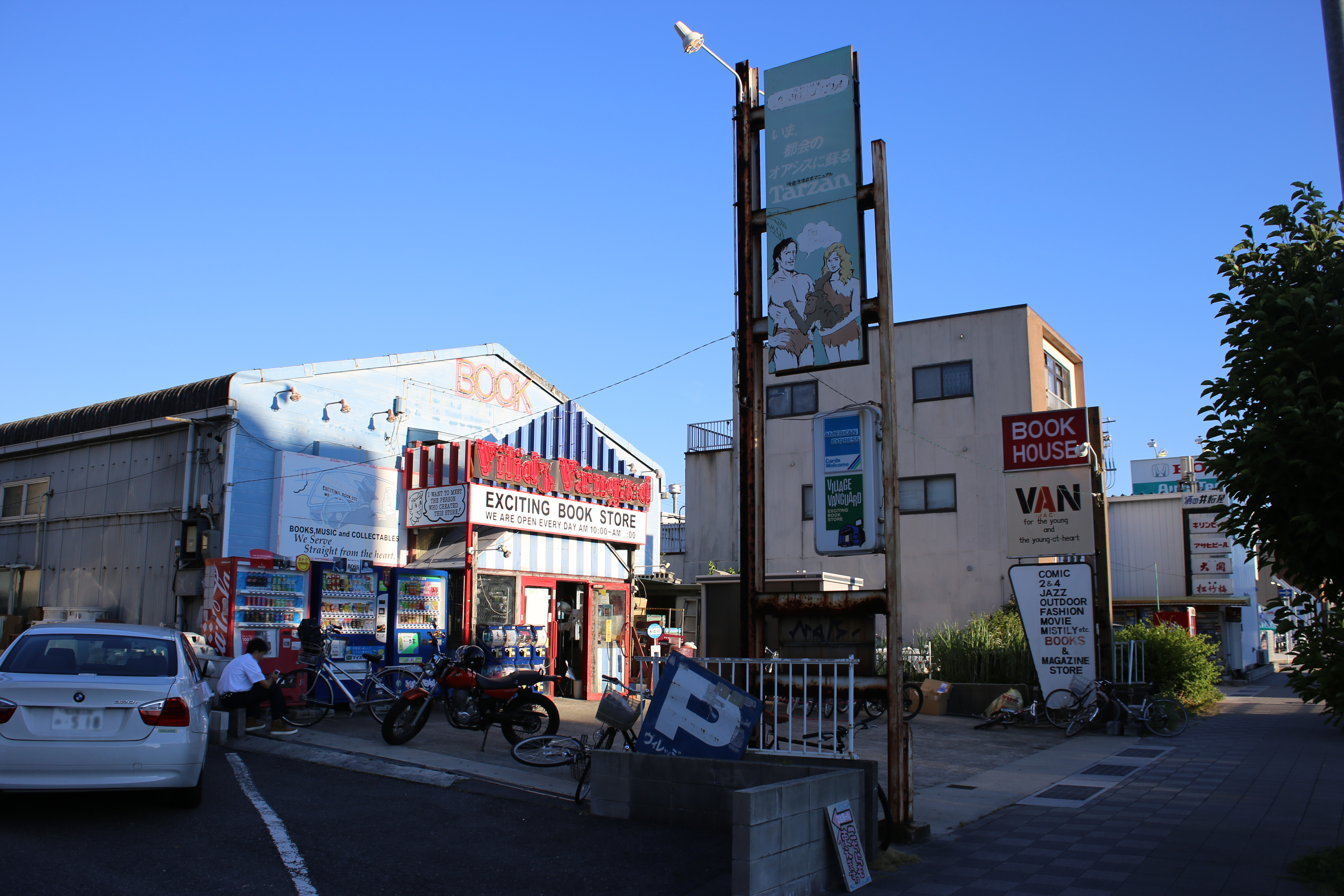
The original Village Vanguard store

Village Vanguard (Japanese: ヴィレッジヴァンガード) is a book store chain that is run by Village Vanguard Corporation in Nagoya, Aichi Prefecture, Japan. The concept of the store is "A playful book store" (遊べる本屋). Although it is a book store, it carries a wide variety of products other than books, such as CDs, DVDs, and products defined in their term SPICEs which is defined as "Select, Pop, Intelligence, Culture and Entertainment" which makes it close to being a variety store.

== History ==
Village Vanguard was founded by Keiichi Kikuchi (菊地敬一, Kikuchi Keiichi) in 1986. The first Village Vanguard store opened in the Tenpaku ward of Nagoya.

The store was named after Village Vanguard, a jazz club located in New York City. This is because Kikuchi first planned on playing jazz in the bookstore, which actually never happened.

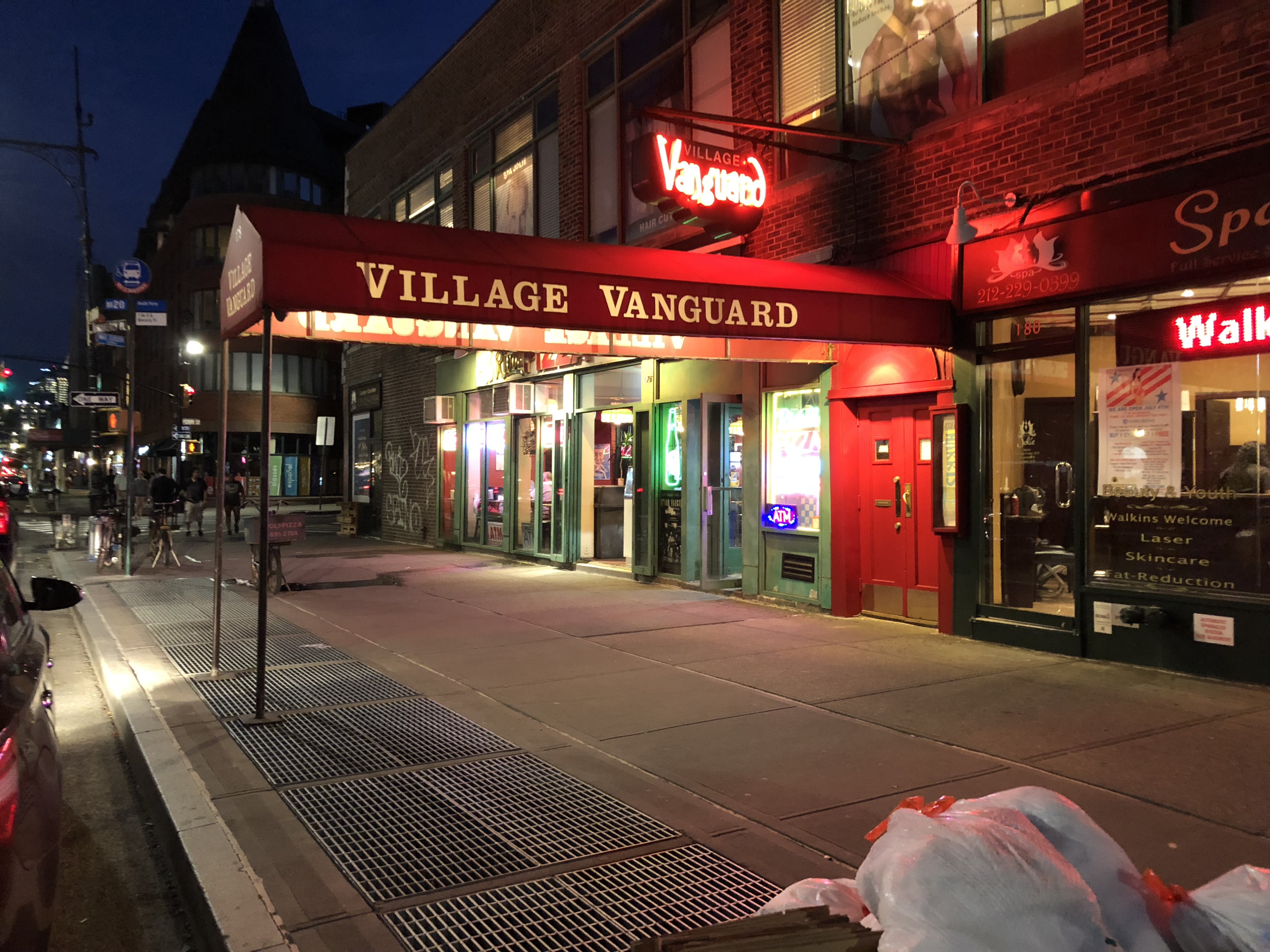
The original Village Vanguard in NYC

== Stores ==
Village Vanguard has 358 shops in total all across Japan, with each store having a completely different layout. The layout of products is one of the biggest characteristics of this store; instead of making the layout simply by category, they locate their product based on the employee's creativity.

== Lists ==
=== Books ===
Although Village Vanguard is distinct as a bookstore, their book sales only makes up for around 30% of their total sales. Unlike a majority of the chain book stores, their line up of books varies at every store, because the selection of books is curated by the manager.

=== Collaborations ===
Village Vanguard is known for collaborating with various properties and aspects of pop culture. This has included bands, companies, YouTubers, and more. The merchandise varies time to time, and they produce things such as clothing, key chains, towels to bowls, sandals etc.

=== SPICE ===
SPICE is a term used in Village Vanguard which stands for Select, Pop, Intelligence, Culture and Entertainment. It is used to refer to all the products except books, CDs and DVDs, things such as toys, clothes and accessories.
