= Själagårdsgatan =

Street in Gamla stan, Stockholm, Sweden

Coordinates: 59°19′28″N 18°04′23″E

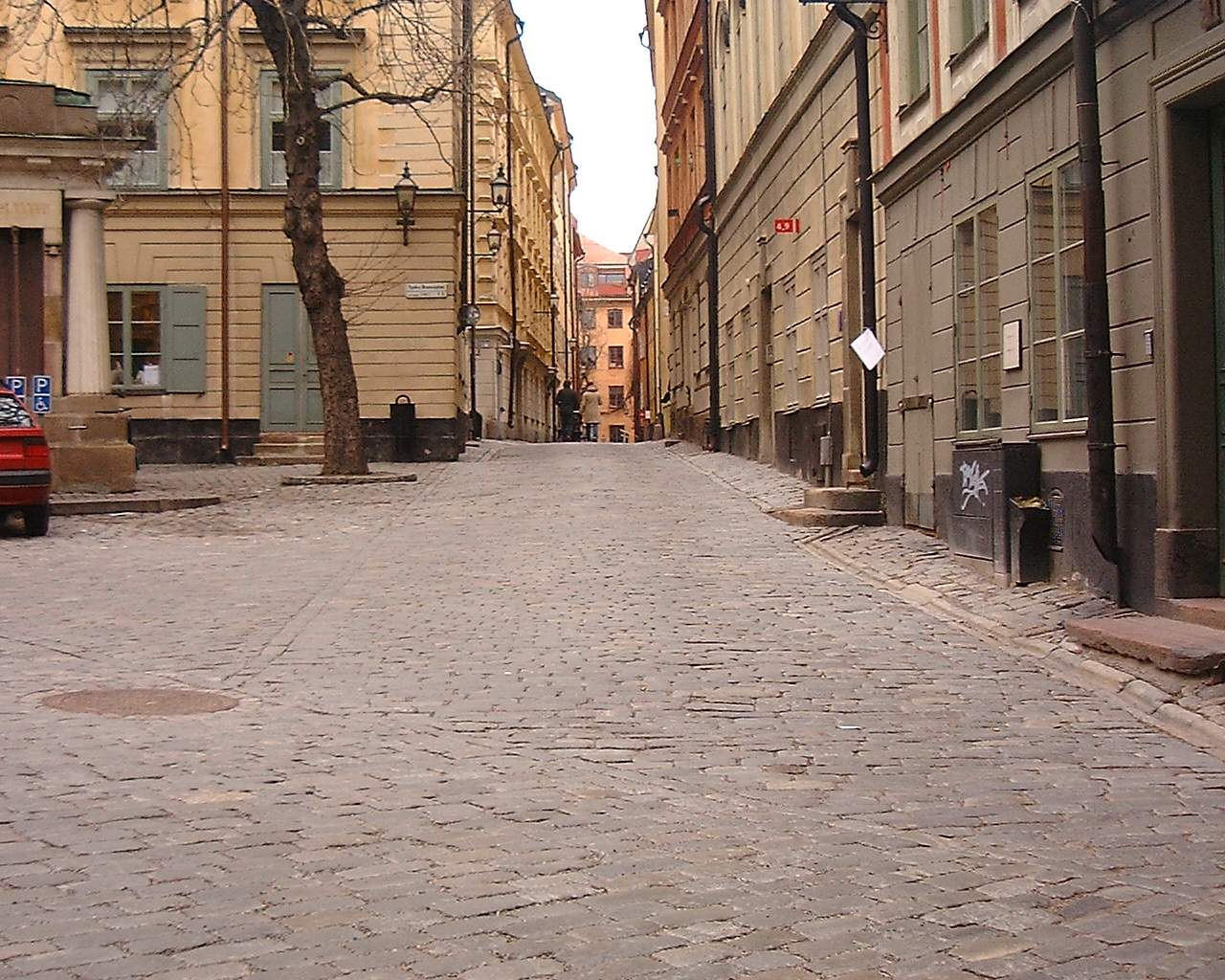
Själagårdsgatan viewed from Tyska Brunnsplan.

Själagårdsgatan (Swedish: "The Charitable Institution Street") is a street in Gamla stan, the old town in central Stockholm, Sweden. Stretching south from Köpmangatan to Tyska Brunnsplan, it forms a parallel street to Baggensgatan. It crosses the small triangular square Brända Tomten and is intercepted by Kindstugatan, Tyska Skolgränd, and Svartmangatan.

== History ==
The street, appearing as Siela gardz gatan in 1487, Sielegatenn in 1593, Siähl gårdz gatan in 1688, and Siärgårds Gatan 1718, is named after a charitable institution (Själagård, "Soul Building/Homestead") built on number 13 in the early 1420s. The institution was founded by a Christian Charitable trust as a home for old and sick, financed by donations (själagåvor, "gifts of the soul"). This sort of Christian institution disappeared after the Reformation during the second half of the 16th century. The building in question was later used as the royal printing house were printing pioneer Jürgen Richolff the Younger produced the 1526 Swedish translation of the New Testament. The building was then used as a junior secondary school (trivialskola, "commoners' school") until the 19th century.

As the Swedish word Själagård declined in use, the street name was gradually interpreted as Skärgårdsgatan ("The Archipelago Street"), which was its official name during the 18th and 19th centuries and still used by older people until the 1960s. The street was officially renamed in 1925.

The film Den vita katten directed by Hasse Ekman in 1950 was shot at this location.

== See also ==
- List of streets and squares in Gamla stan
