= Svartmangatan =

Street in Gamla stan, Stockholm, Sweden

Coordinates: 59°19′27″N 18°04′20″E

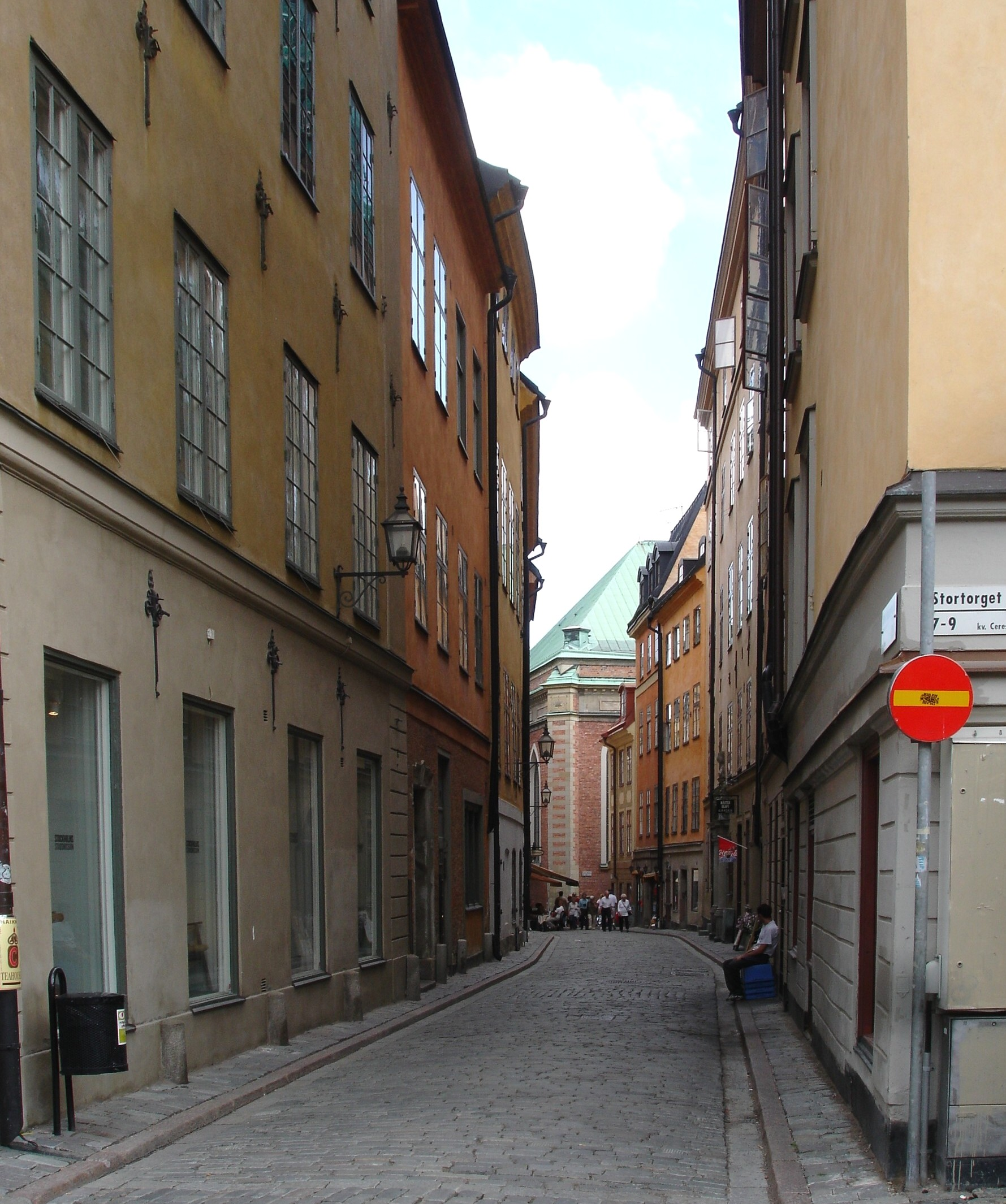
Svartmangatan viewed from Stortorget

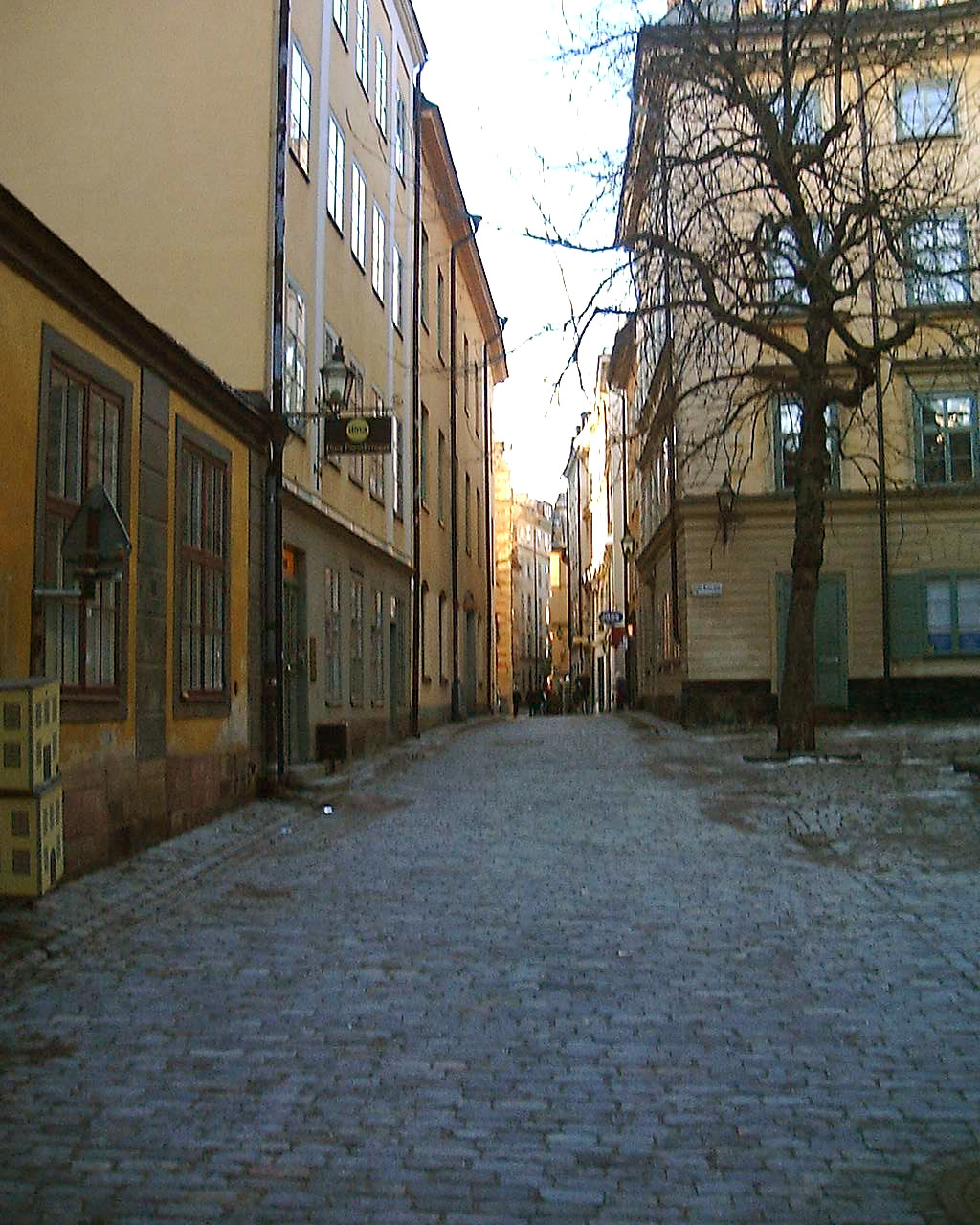
From Tyska Brunnsplan

Svartmangatan (Swedish: (literally)) "Black Man Street") is a street in Gamla stan, the old town of Stockholm, Sweden. Stretching south-east from the central square Stortorget to Södra Benickebrinken and Norra Benickebrinken leading to the eastern main street Österlånggatan, it is intercepted by Kindstugatan, Tyska Skolgränd, Tyska Brunnsplan, Själagårdsgatan, Tyska Stallplan, and Baggensgatan, while forming a parallel street to Skomakargatan and Prästgatan. The name refers to the Blackfriar monastery once located at the southern end of the street.

Mentioned as early as 1437 and thus one of the oldest streets of Stockholm, Svartmangatan was once also one of its main streets, leading from the central square to the abbey of the Blackfriars. Until the 17th century it was called Svartmunka - or Svartbrödra - ("black monks/brothers"), and, because there are no records of the Dominican friars being referred to as "black men", the only reasonable explanation for the present name of the street is an attempt to create an analogy to Köpmangatan ("The Merchant's Street", or literally "buyer-man-street"), a street also leading from Stortorget.

== See also ==
- List of streets and squares in Gamla stan
