= Köpmanbrinken =

Street in Gamla stan, Stockholm, Sweden

Coordinates: 59°19′31.0″N 18°04′25.4″E

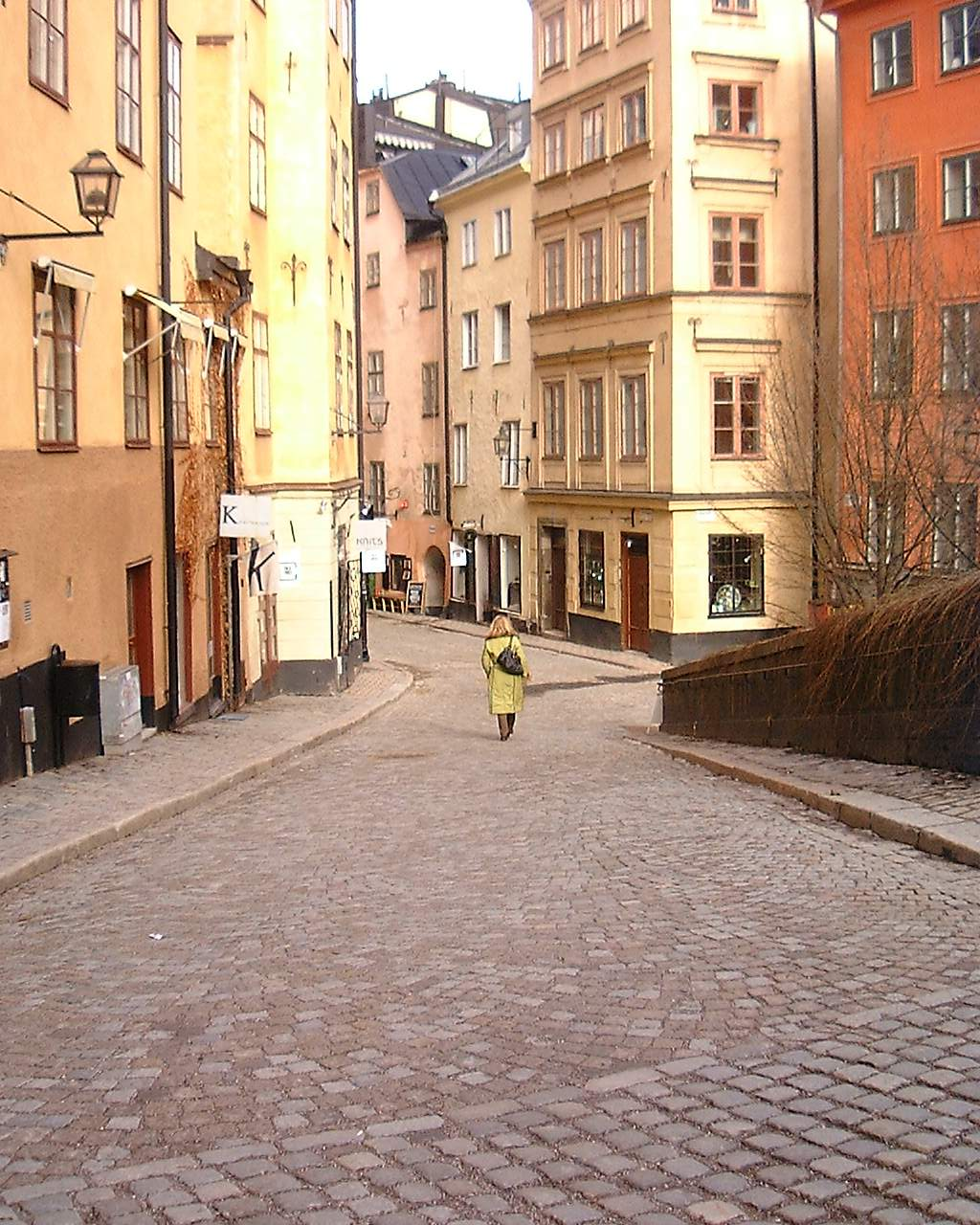
Northern slope of Köpmanbrinken in March 2007.

Köpmanbrinken (Swedish: "Merchant's Slope") is a street composed of two slopes, in Gamla stan, the old town in central Stockholm, Sweden. Both slopes connect the street Österlånggatan west up to the small Köpmantorget and the street Köpmangatan.

Since the foundation of the city the slopes reflects the original inclination treadled by the city's first inhabitants.

The northern slope was referred to as Fiskestrandsbrinken ("Fishing Shore Slope") during the Middle Ages, because the area east of the slopes, between the alleys Nygränd and Brunnsgränd, used to be the city's main fish market Fiskaretorget until 1520. The statue of St George and his princess is replica made in 1912 of the medieval original in the cathedral Storkyrkan.

On the narrow space along the slopes' eastern sides, where the statue of Saint George and the Dragon is found today, there was an entire block called Acteon which was demolished following a collapse in 1829. The slopes were made less steep following the collapse. During the 19th century, the slopes were regarded as two individual streets, separated by the square Köpmantorget. The two streets were subsequently united as a single street with its present name in 1885.

== See also ==
- List of streets and squares in Gamla stan
