= Triewaldsgränd =

Street in Gamla stan, Stockholm, Sweden

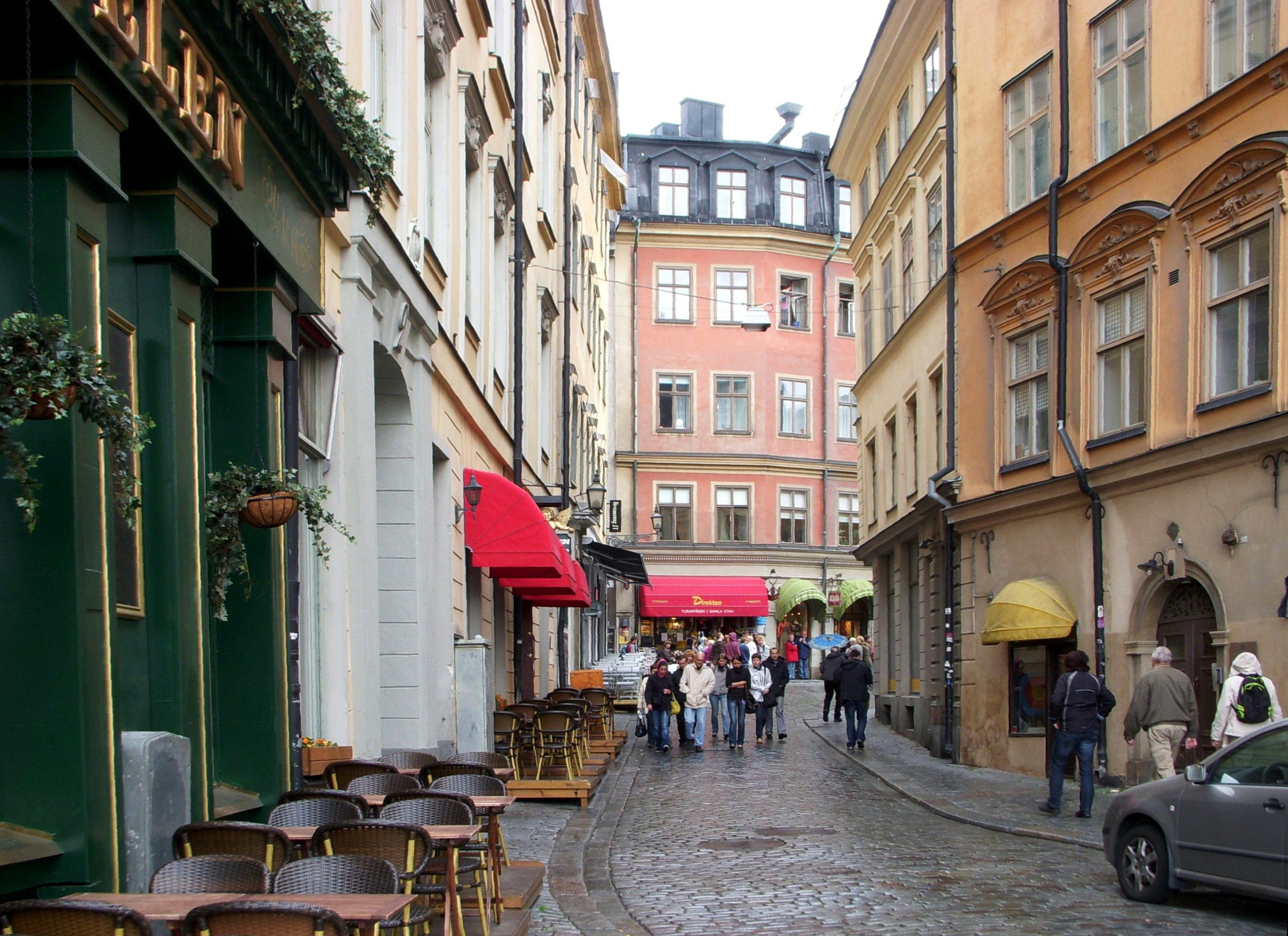
Triewaldsgränd in 2009

Triewaldsgränd (Swedish: "Alley of Triewalds") is an alley in Gamla stan, the old town in central Stockholm, Sweden. Stretching south from the square Järntorget to Kornhamnstorg and Munkbroleden, it forms a parallel street to Funckens Gränd and Järntorgsgatan.

The name is derived from the German farrier and anchor smith Mårten Triewald the Elder who bought a building at number 5 in 1694. He is mostly known through his sons, the captain and mechanic Mårten Triewald the Younger, co-founder of the Royal Swedish Academy of Sciences, and the diplomat and poet Samuel von Triewald. The street is labelled Triwalds gr[änd] on a map dated 1733, but is humorously referred to as Trivialsgränd ("The Trivial Alley"), either a paraphrasing of the original name or referring to the block north of Järntorget named Trivia.

== See also ==
- List of streets and squares in Gamla stan
