= Kråkgränd =

Alley in Gamla stan, Stockholm, Sweden

Coordinates: 59°19′31.2″N 18°04′29.1″E

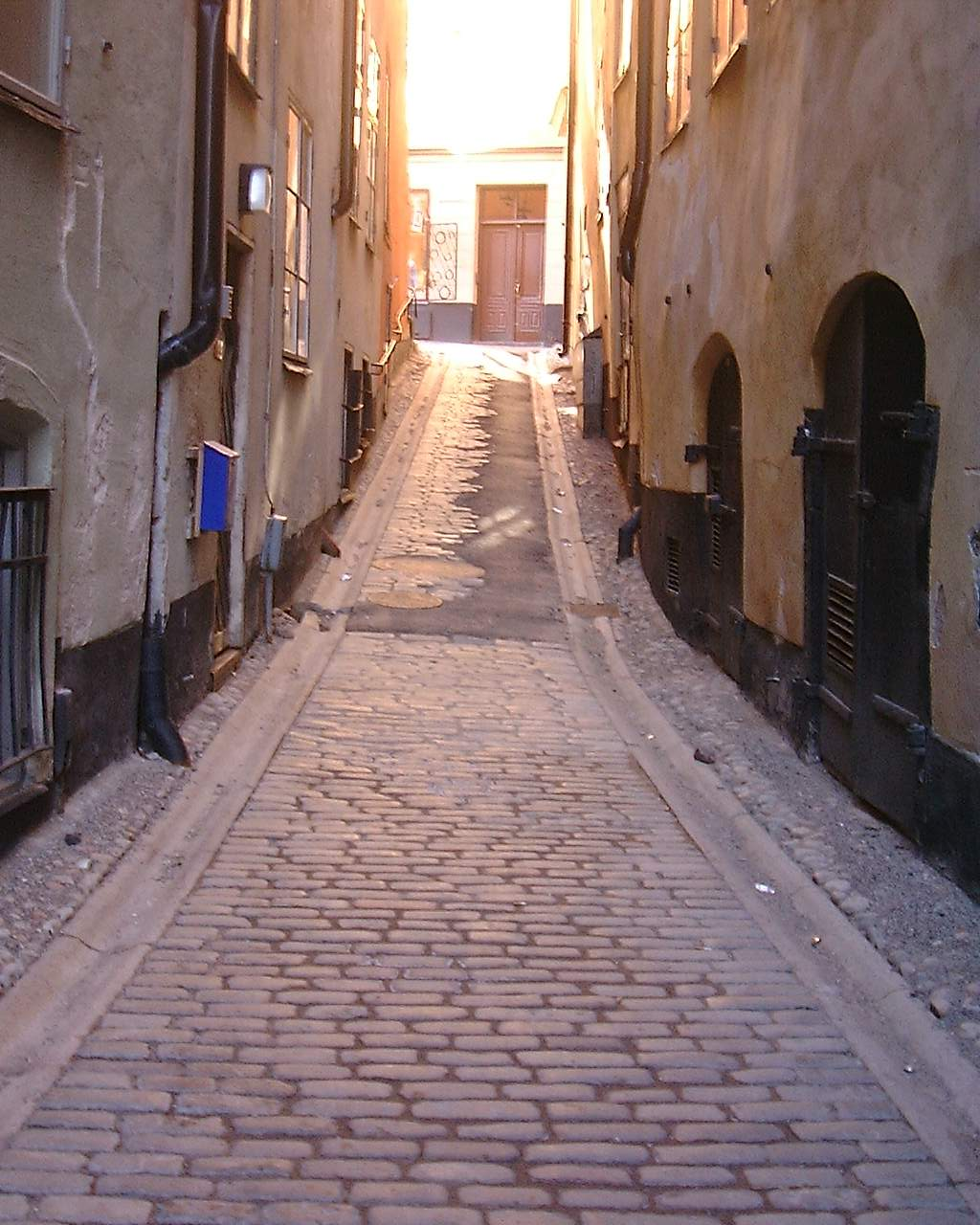
Western end of Kråkgränd leading up to Österlånggatan.

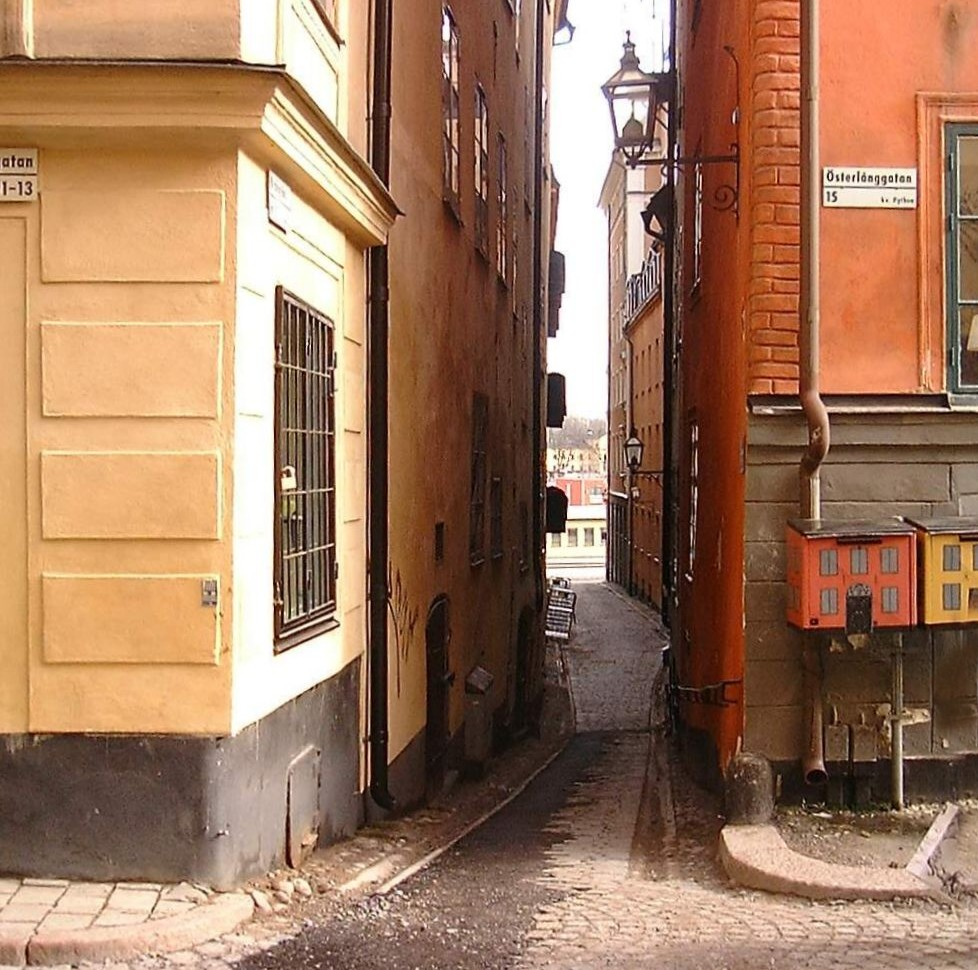
Kråkgränd viewed from Österlånggatan in March 2007.

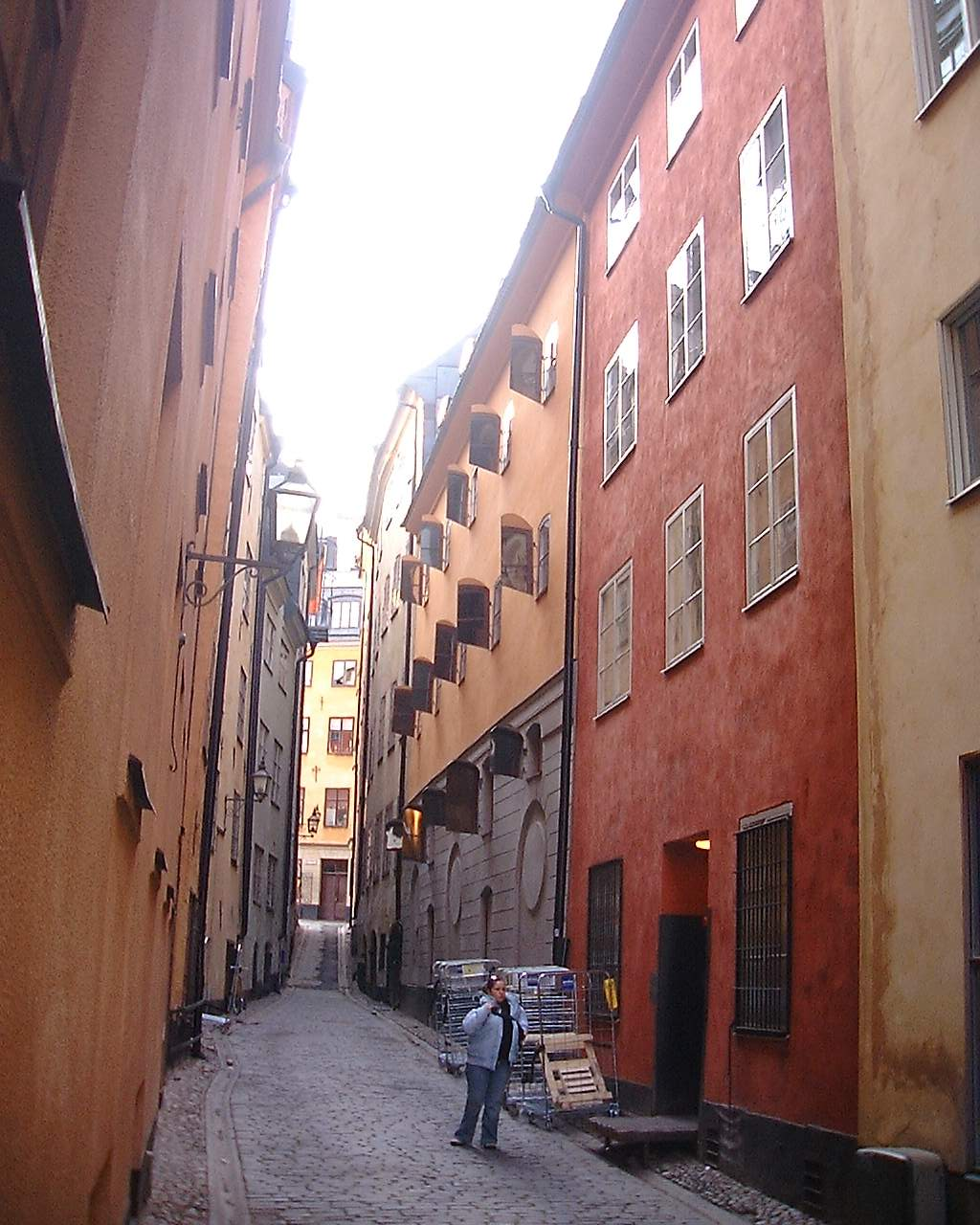
Shutter with mirrors facing Skeppsbron.

Kråkgränd (Swedish: "Crow Alley") is an alley in Gamla stan, the old town of Stockholm, Sweden. Stretching between Skeppsbron and Österlånggatan, it forms a parallel street to Bredgränd and Nygränd.

The alley is named after Knut Nilsson Kråka, who in 1608 was promoted to become one of the 48 Elders of the city and in 1615 became a magistrate. He failed to deliver taxes required however and was subsequently relieved of his duties in 1623 and died as a custom officer by the southern gate in 1625.

== See also ==
- List of streets and squares in Gamla stan
