= Skeppar Karls Gränd =

Alley in Gamla stan, Stockholm, Sweden

Coordinates: 59°19′32.70″N 18°04′29.00″E

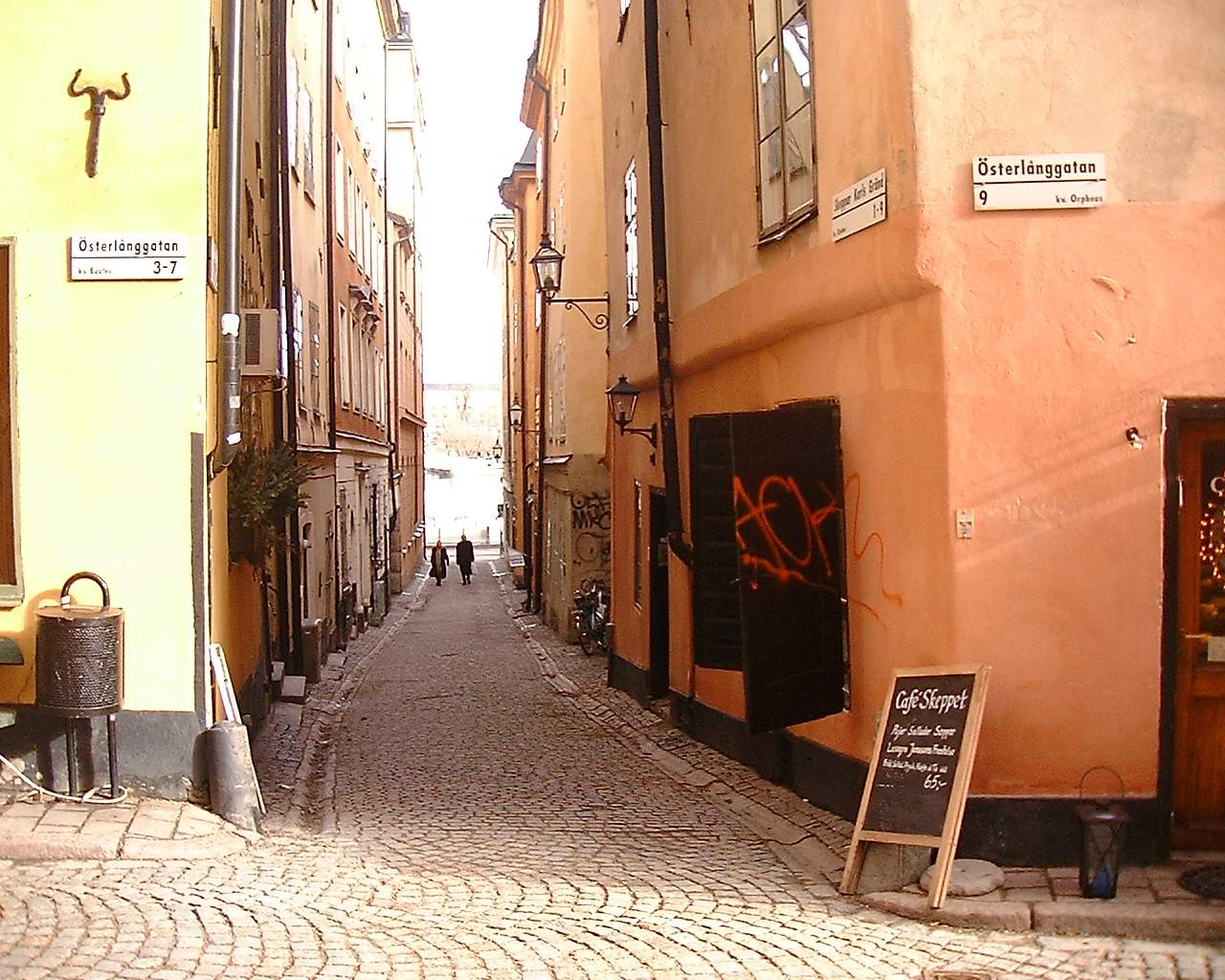
Skeppar Karls Gränd viewed from Österlånggatan.

Skeppar Karls Gränd (Swedish: "Skipper Karl's Alley") is an alley in Gamla stan, the old town of Stockholm, Sweden. Stretching from Skeppsbron to Österlånggatan, it forms a parallel street to Telegrafgränd and Bredgränd.

== History ==
The alley is named after a skipper who bought a property here in 1564. A tower in the city wall was also named after him in 1581 (Skeppar Karls torn). The alley was mentioned in 1569 as Anders bottnekarls gränd (after a man named Anders from northern Sweden (either Västerbotten, Norrbotten, or Österbotten) whose economy made him face prosecution at several occasions. The alley was also temporarily known as Styrmansgränden ("First Mate Alley") although the reason for this name is unknown.

== See also ==
- List of streets and squares in Gamla stan
