= Brunnsgränd =

Street in Gamla stan, Stockholm, Sweden

Coordinates: 59°19′30.1″N 18°04′29.5″E

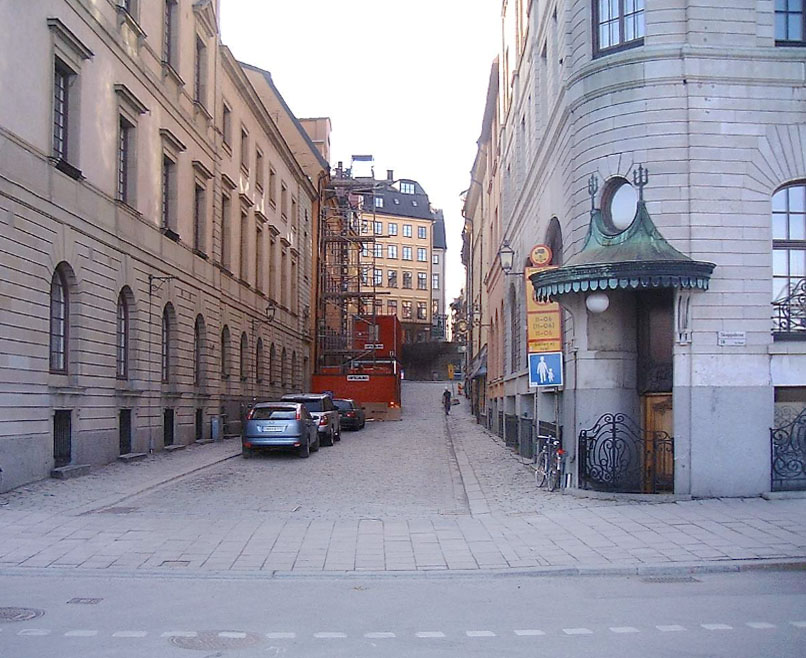
Brunnsgränd in February 2007. The tiny gap left between the buildings in the foreground and the background shows how the eastern waterfront was connected directly to the main square Stortorget during the Middle Ages.

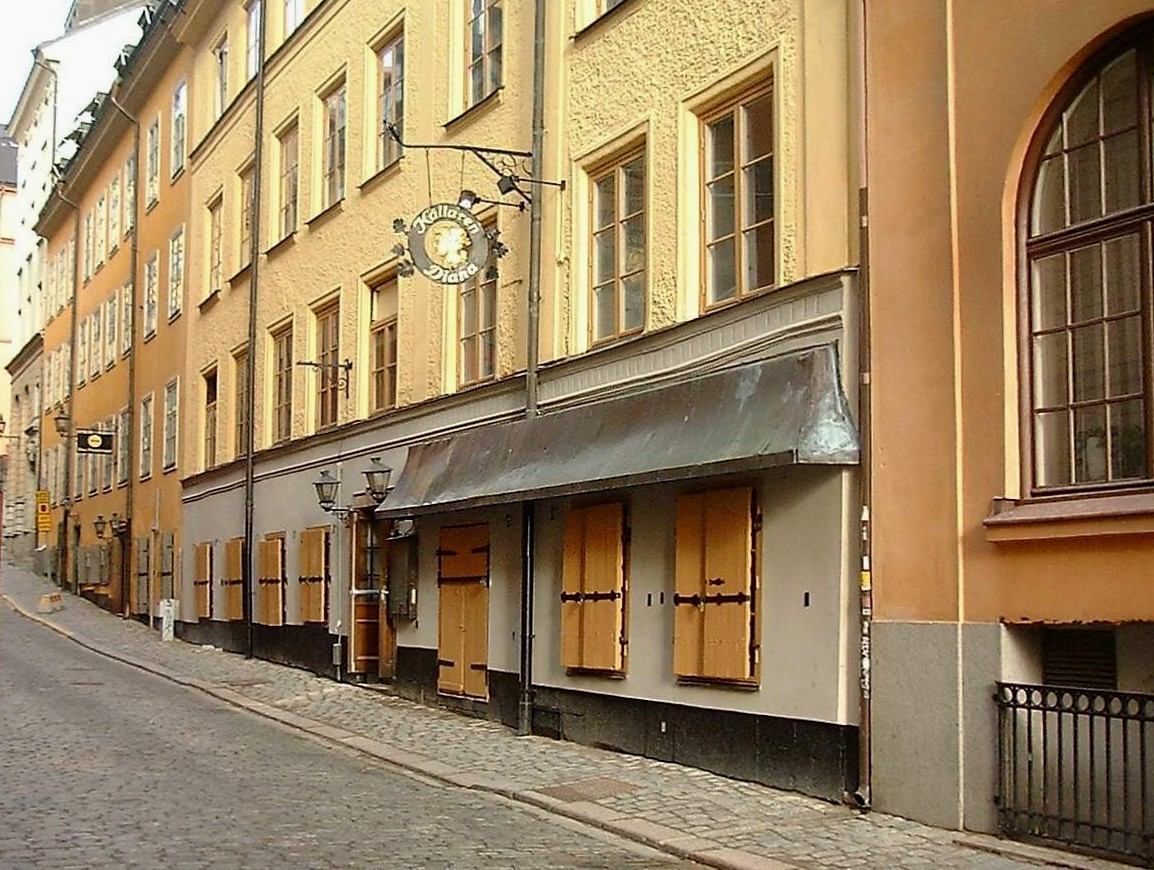
The restaurant on Number 2, Källaren Diana, is named after the block which replaced the old fish market in the 1520s.

Brunnsgränd (Swedish: "Well Alley") is an alley in Gamla stan, the old town in central Stockholm, Sweden. Connecting Skeppsbron to Österlånggatan, it forms a parallel street to Nygränd and Skottgränd. It is the widest alley in the old town.

The alley, mentioned as brundzgrenden in 1526, is named after a water well mentioned in 1461, when a blacksmith named Henrik was paid for having "forged on the well on 'Fisherman's Square'" (smidat till brunnen på Fiskaretorget). Historically, wells in cities were located in open spaces, and, oddly enough, neither a well or a square can be found near the present alley. During the Middle Ages and until the 1520s, however, a square called Fisketorget was found between Brunnsgränd and the alley north of it, Nygränd ("New Alley"), at the time the biggest in Stockholm connected to the central square Stortorget ("The Big Square") through Köpmangatan ("The Merchant's Street"). In the early 19th century, the well could still be found in the western end of the alley, but it has since been surrounded by buildings. Occasionally, the alley's name is erroneously associated with a fountain from 1912, located on Österlånggatan, under the statue of Saint George and the Dragon.

== See also ==
- List of streets and squares in Gamla stan
