= Nygränd =

Alley in Gamla stan, Stockholm, Sweden

Coordinates: 59°19′30.1″N 18°04′29.2″E

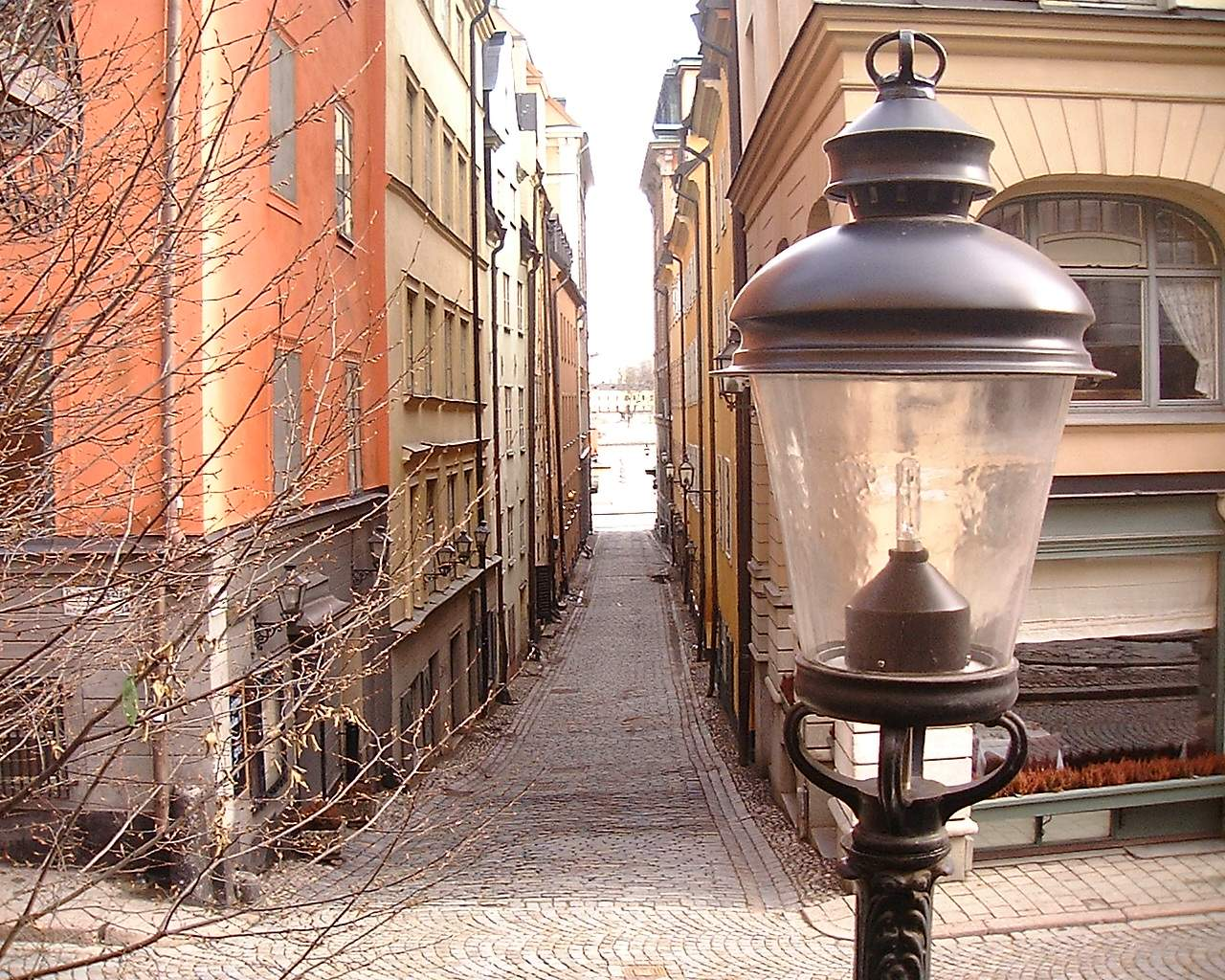
Nygränd in March 2007.

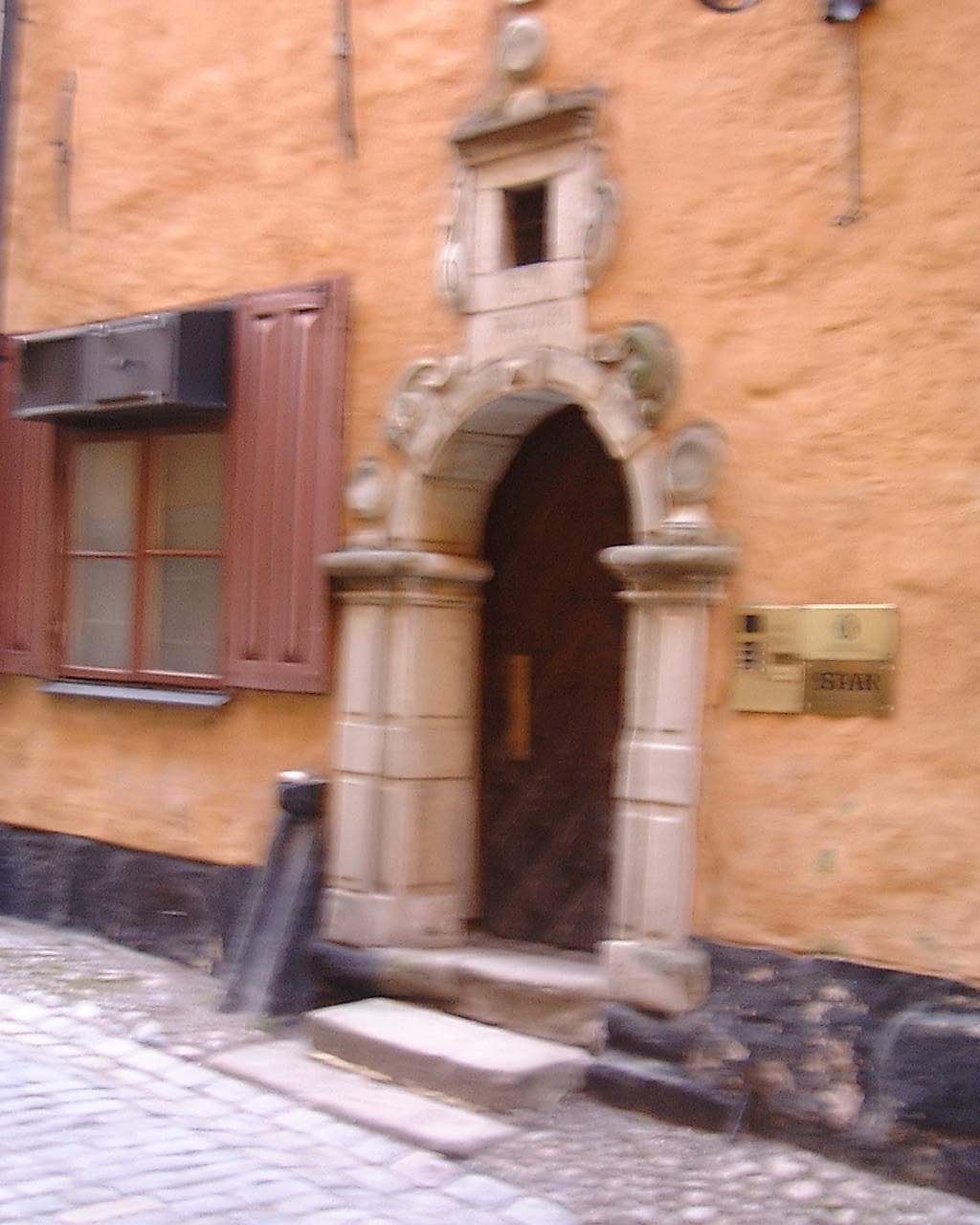
Number 2.

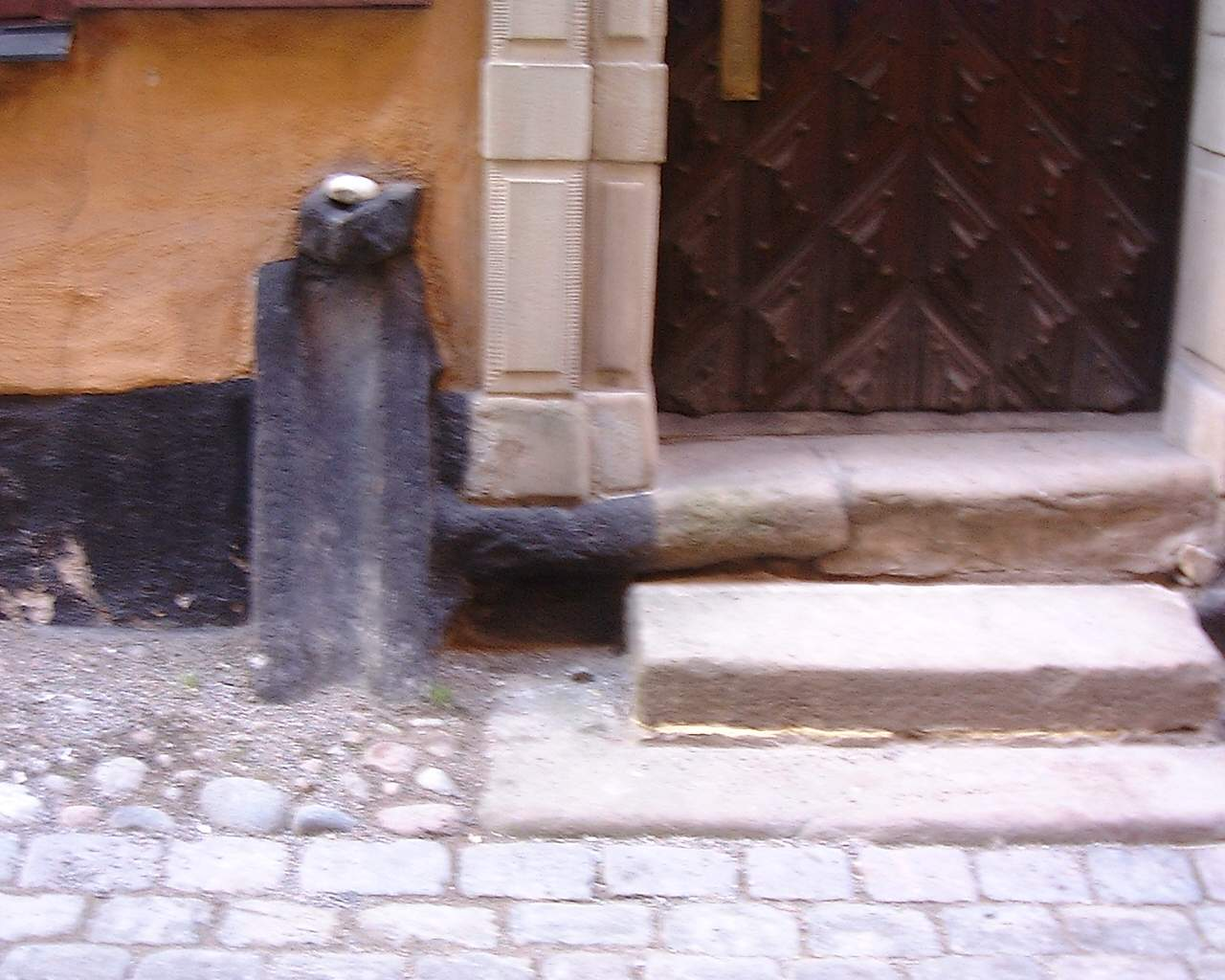
A medieval waste pipe next to the front door of Number 2.

Nygränd (Swedish: New Alley) is an alley in Gamla stan, the old town of Stockholm, Sweden, connecting Skeppsbron to Österlånggatan.

Old names
Niia grenden (1553), Nygrenden (1570)

Until the early 1520s, a fish market (Fisketorget, "The Fisherman's Square") was located between the site of the present alley and the alley south of it, Brunnsgränd, the square at the time forming a natural continuation to Köpmangatan ("The Merchant's Street"), the street leading east from the central square Stortorget.

One of the old town's most elaborate portals is found on 2, Nygränd.

Parallel streets
Kråkgränd, Brunnsgränd
Crossing streets
Skeppsbron, Österlånggatan

== See also ==
- List of streets and squares in Gamla stan
