= Slottskajen =

Street and wharf in Gamla stan, Stockholm, Sweden

Coordinates: 59°19′39″N 18°04′14″E

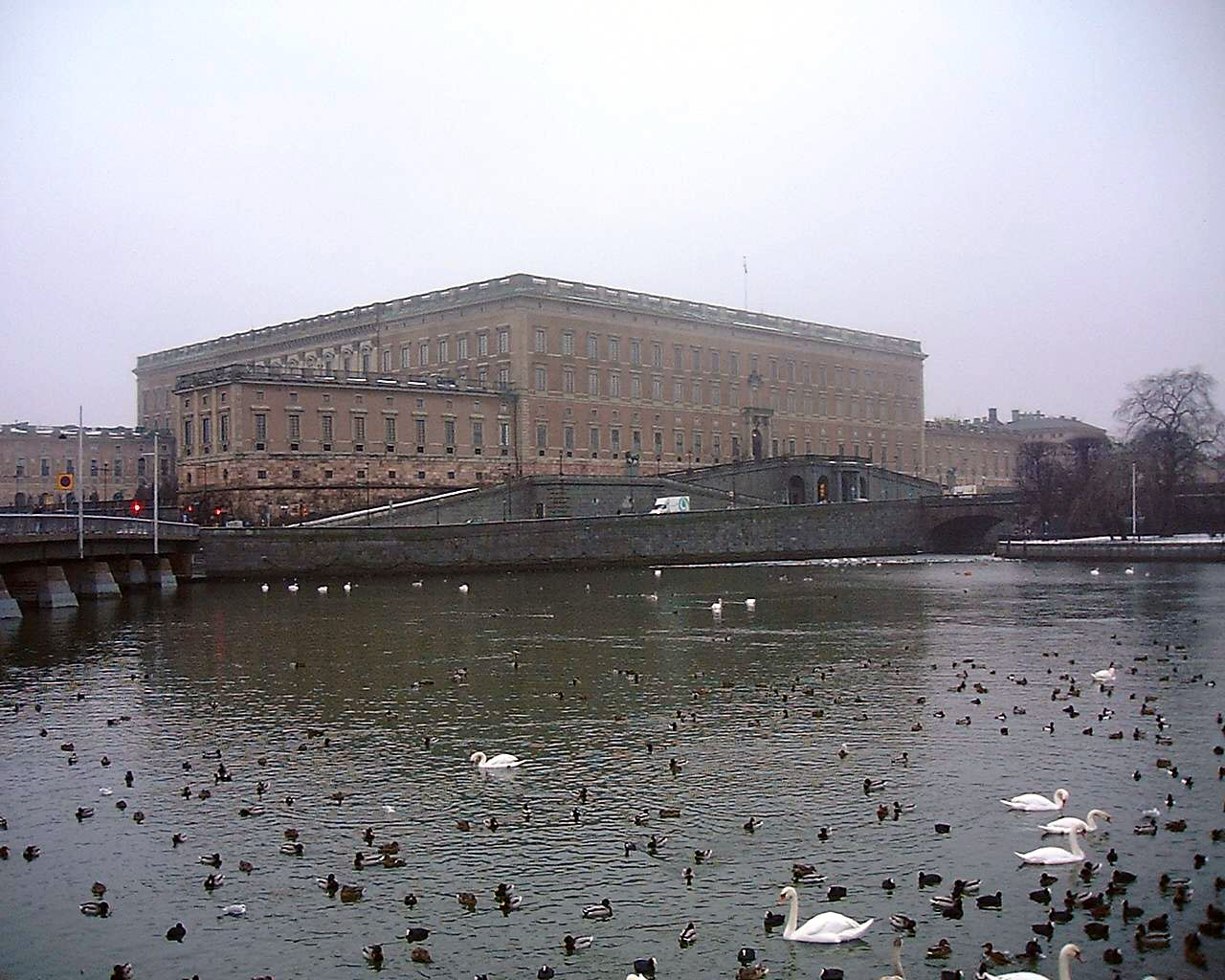
Slottskajen passing in front of the northern façade of the Royal Palace in March 2007.

Slottskajen (Swedish: "Palace Quay") is a quay and a street in Gamla stan, the old town in central Stockholm, Sweden.

== History ==
Named after its location north of the Royal Palace, it stretches west from Skeppsbron and Strömbron to the square Mynttorget, overlooked by Lejonbacken, the ramps leading to the palace's northern entrance, and, passing along the canal Stallkanalen, is connected to the island Helgeandsholmen with The Riksdag by the bridge Norrbro.

The present name was made official in 1921, substituting the original proposal Slottsstranden ("Palace Shore").

Behind the five-metre-thick walls of the palace's northern wing, dating from the 13th century, is the Tre Kronor Museum, exhibiting objects from and models of the Tre Kronor Palace, destroyed by fire in 1697.

== See also ==
- List of streets and squares in Gamla stan
