= Myntgatan =

Street in Gamla stan, Stockholm, Sweden

Coordinates: 59°19′33.6″N 18°04′1.4″E

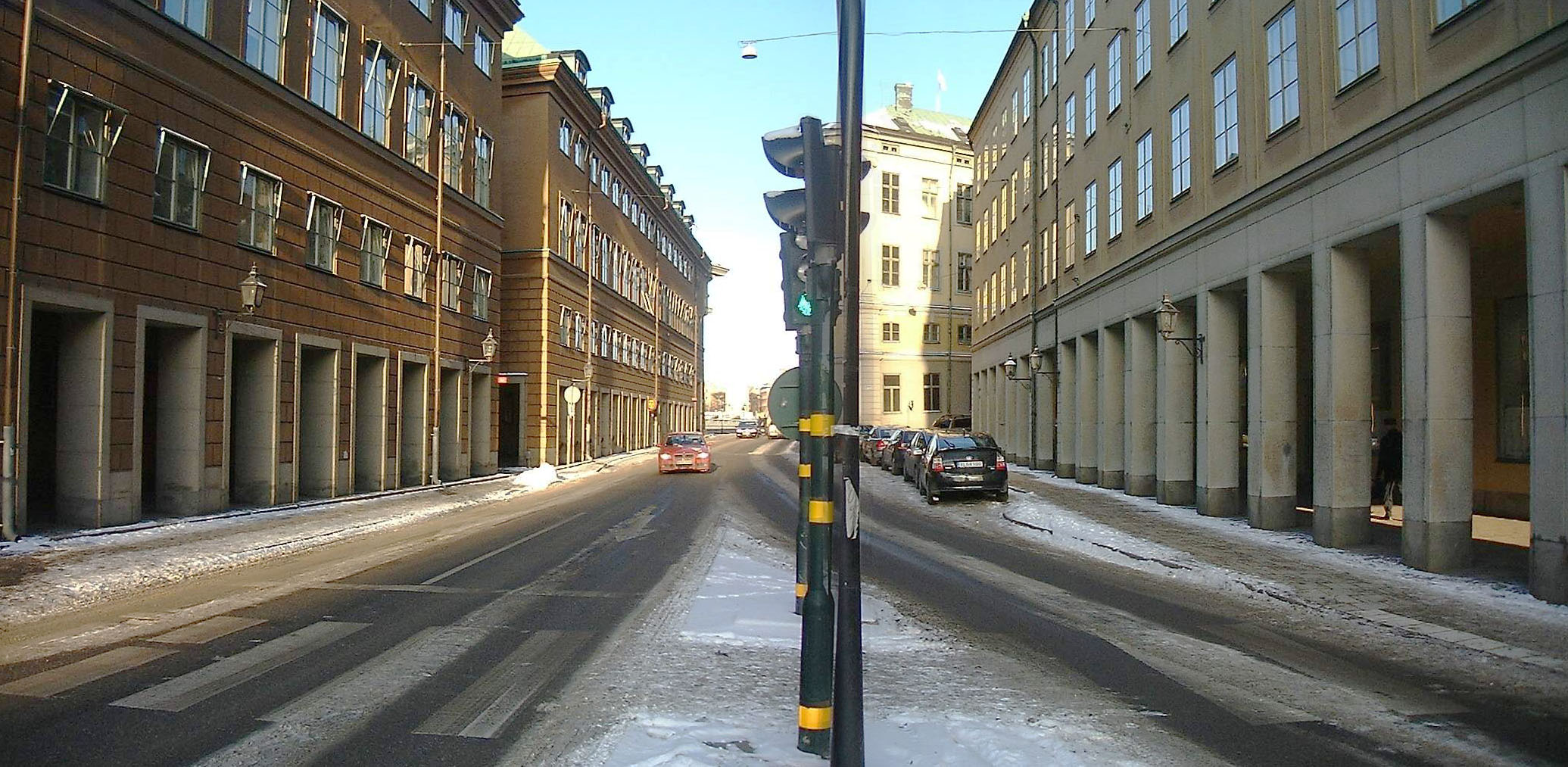
Myntgatan in February 2007.

Myntgatan (Swedish: [ˈmʏ̂ntˌɡɑːtan]) is a street in Gamla stan, the old town in central Stockholm, Sweden. Stretching west from Mynttorget over to Riddarhustorget, it is crossed by the streets Salviigränd, Rådhusgränd, Riddarhusgränd, and Storkyrkobrinken.

Most of the buildings surrounding the street are occupied by either the Parliament or the Supreme Court.

== History ==
While the square Mynttorget was named for its proximity to the Royal Mint and is present on a map dated 1733 AD, the name of the street Myntgatan is most likely much younger. On a map from the 1630s it is called Skattmestere Gattun ("Treasurer's Street"), probably in reference to Gabriel Bengtsson Oxenstierna (1586–1656) who owned a single land parcel by the street. It has also been referred to as Salviigränd.

Following the completion of Stora Nygatan in the 1660s, it was realized that this new boulevard-like street, a pride for a still largely medieval Stockholm, could not end up blindly in what was then a peripheral end of the city – an insight which led to the gradual creation of Myntgatan which forms a perpendicular angle to Stora Nygatan in the Baroque manner of the era.

The street was thus extended east to Mynttorget as the latter was created in 1672 and the old defensive tower, Norre port, was demolished. It was then called Riddargatan ("Knight's Street") or Riddarhusgatan ("Knight's House Street") until the late-19th century in references to Riddarhuset, but apparently different names were used for the eastern and western ends of the street.

== See also ==
- List of streets and squares in Gamla stan
- History of Stockholm
