= Kanslikajen =

Wharf in Gamla stan, Stockholm, Sweden

Coordinates: 59°19′36.6″N 18°04′01.4″E

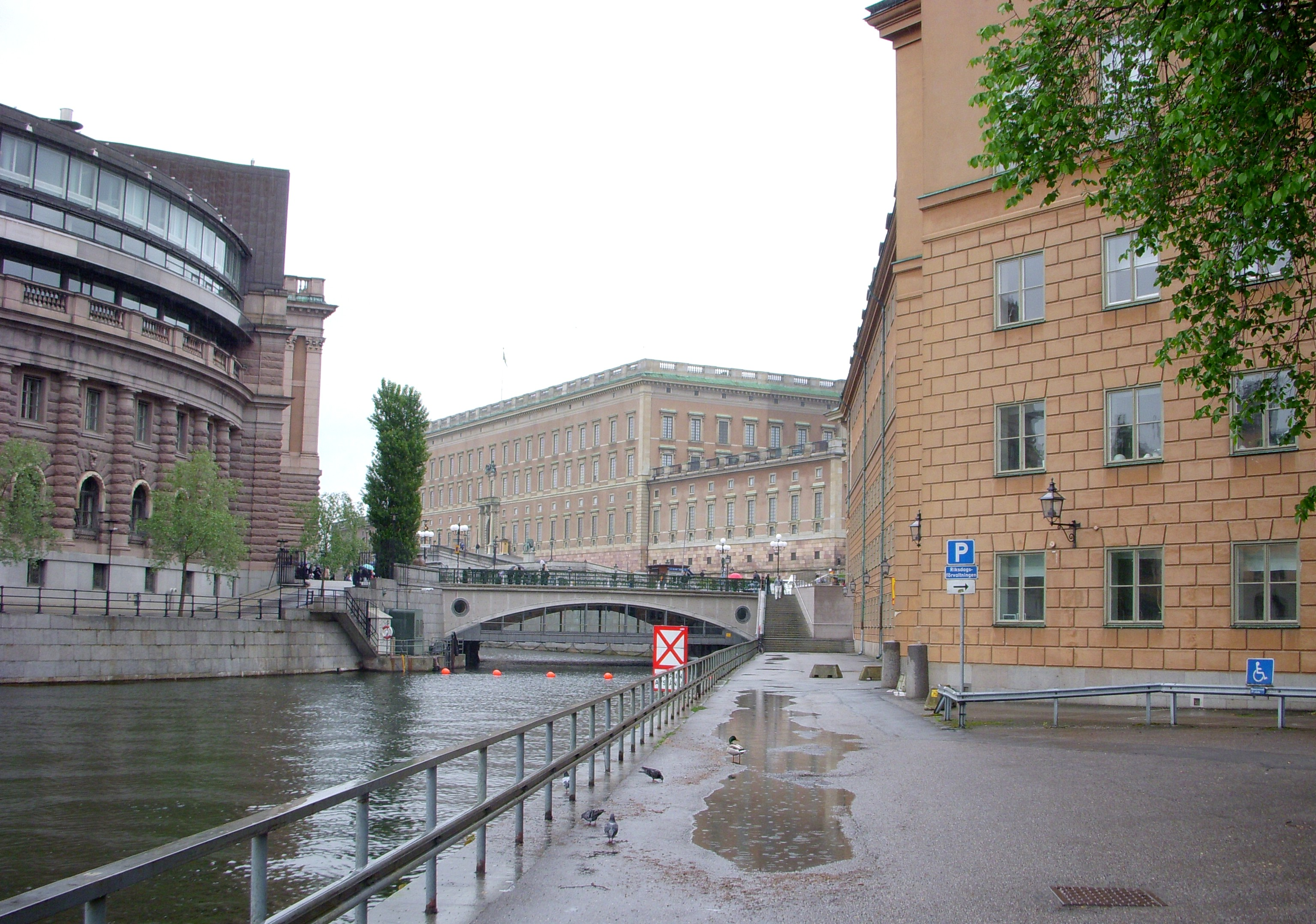
Kanslikajen 2009

Kanslikajen (Swedish: "Chancellery Quay") is a quay in Gamla stan, the old town of Stockholm, Sweden, leading west along the southern shore of the canal Stallkanalen from Stallbron and Mynttorget to Vasabron.

The name was first proposed in 1921, and finally accepted in 1925 after other proposals such as Kanslistranden ("Chancellery Shore") had been discussed. By the quay was an old prison, the kind introduced in the 19th century with individual cells for the inmates, a tradition discontinued in the 1940s.

As part of Projekt Nattljus ("Project Night Light") which ran from 1999 to 2006, the quay was furnished with lighting together with other areas facing the water in the neighbourhood, including Riddarhustorget, Riddarhusgränd, Rådhusgränd and Munkbrohamnen.

== See also ==
- List of streets and squares in Gamla stan
