= Stadsholmen =

Island constituting the majority of Gamla stan in Stockholm, Sweden

Coordinates: 59°19′29″N 18°04′16″E

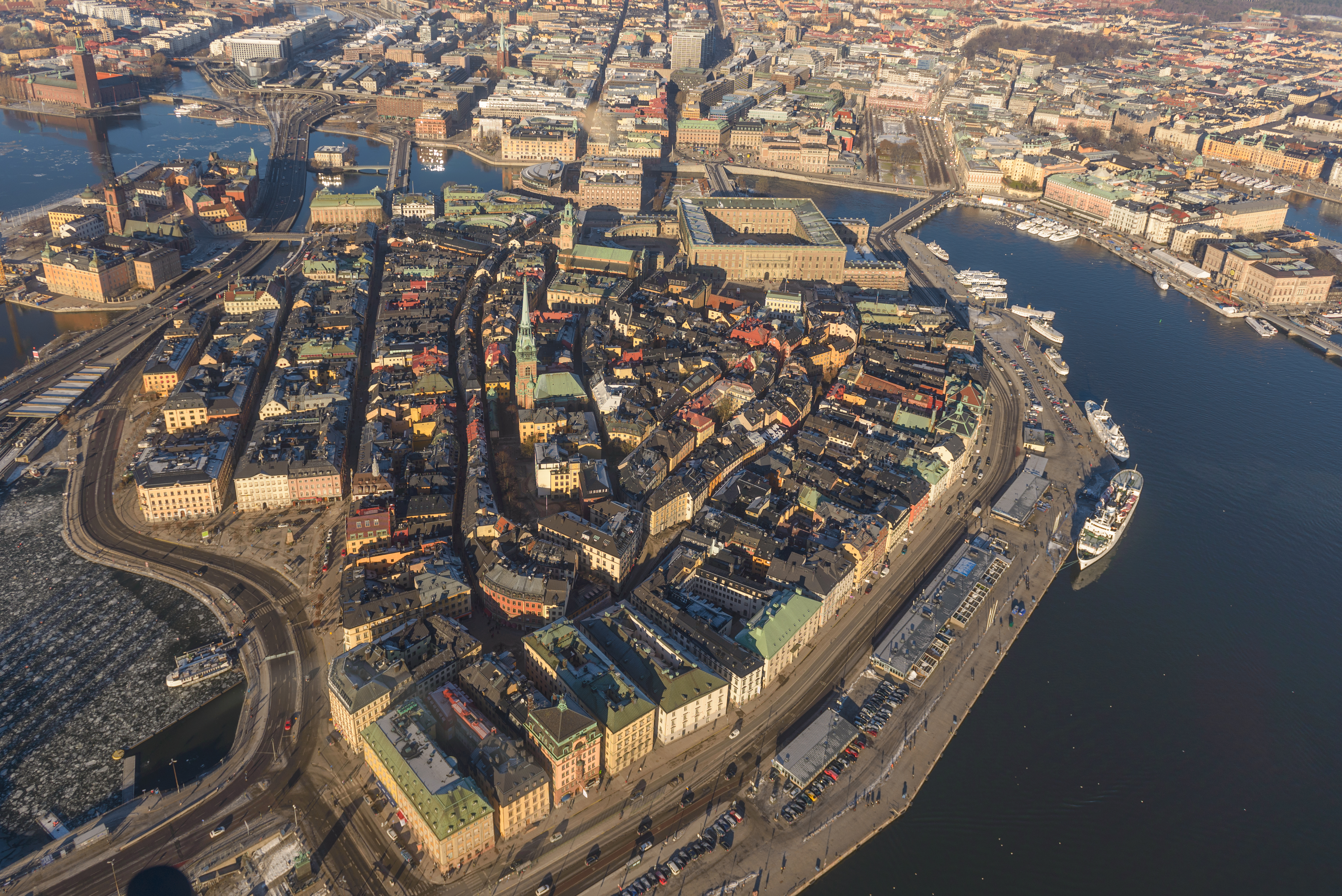
Stadsholmen aerial view, 2013

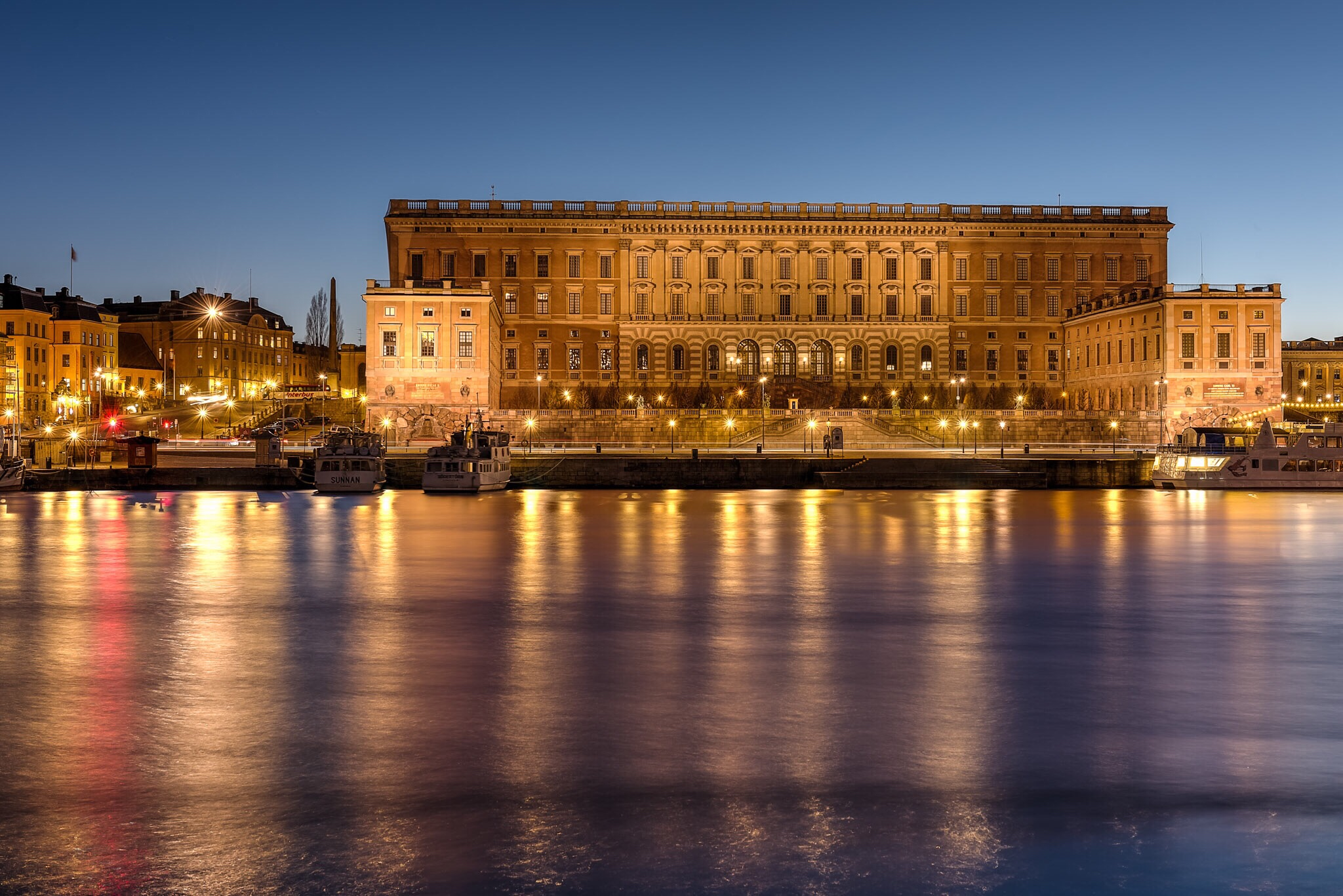
The Royal Palace

Stadsholmen (literally "Town Island") is the historical name of an island in the centre of Stockholm, Sweden. Stadsholmen is connected to the mainland via several bridges. Together with the small islands of Riddarholmen and Helgeandsholmen it forms Gamla stan, the old town of Stockholm. The name Gamla stan can also refer to the island itself, as the name Stadsholmen is rarely used in daily speech.

Stadsholmen is the location of Stockholm Palace, the official residence and working palace of the Swedish monarch, and used for ceremonial receptions. The offices of the King, the other members of the Swedish Royal Family, and the offices of the Royal Court of Sweden are located here.
