= Gustavian style =

Swedish period style

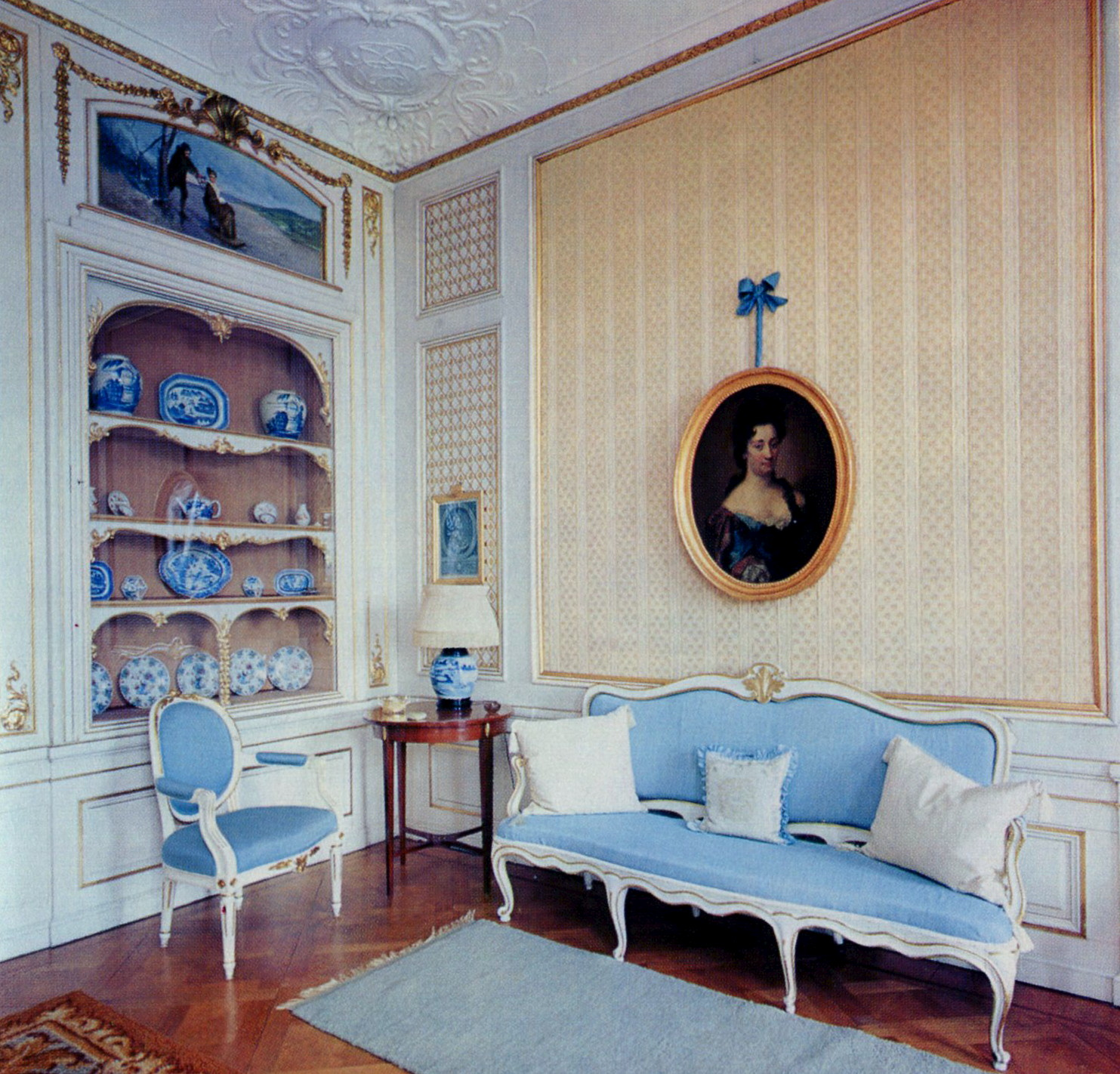
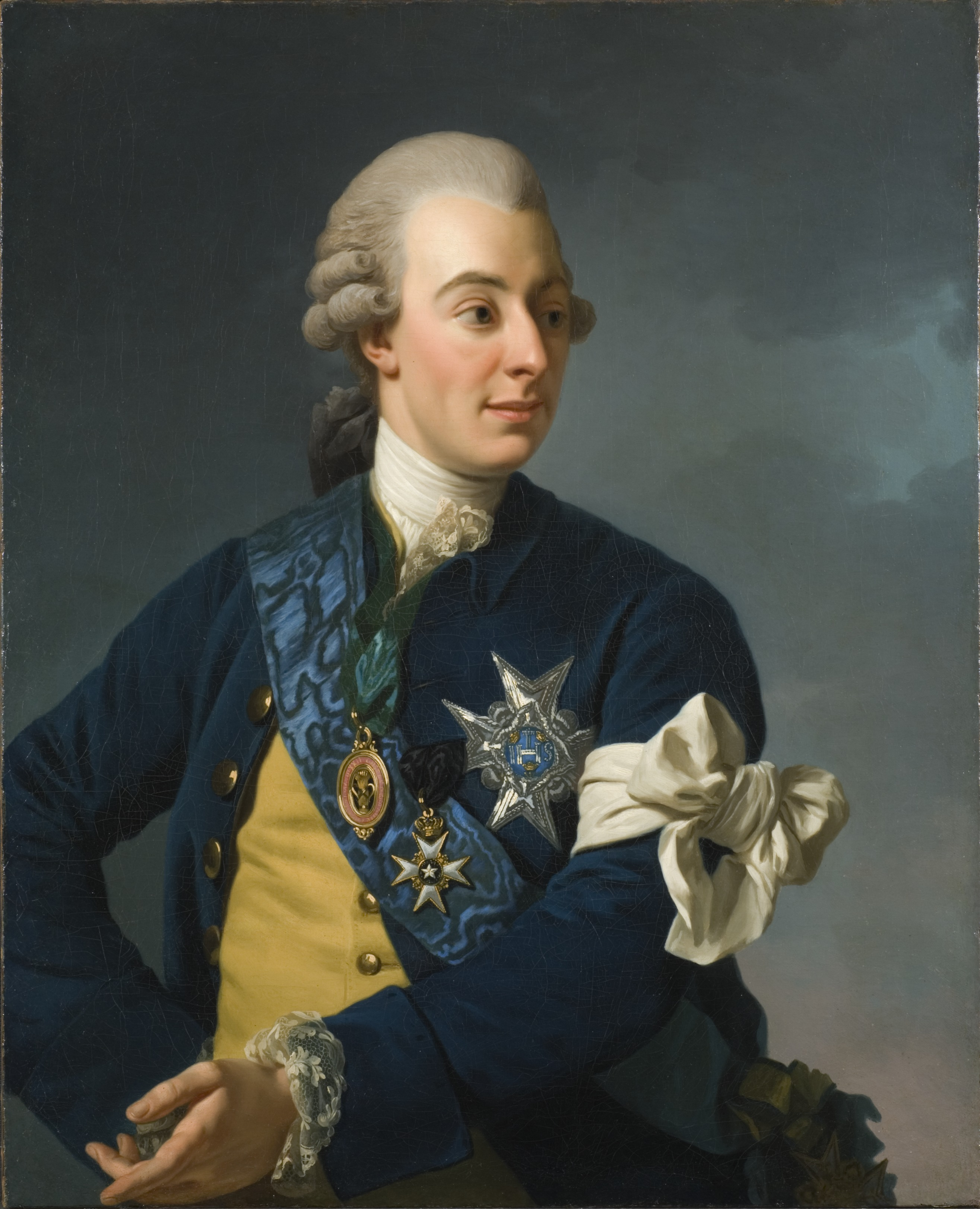
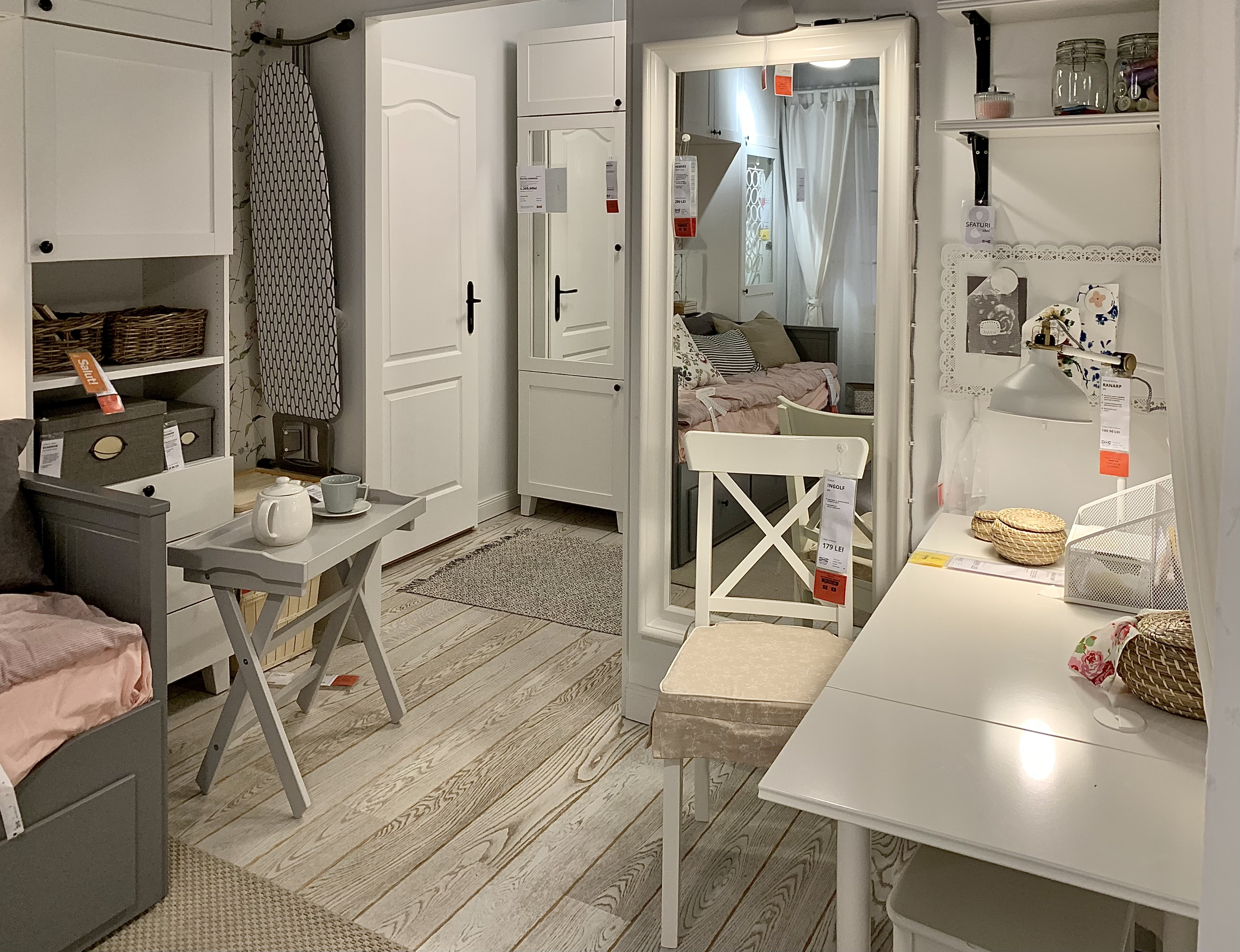
- Top to bottom: Gustavian interior at Södertuna Castle; King Gustav III of Sweden; IKEA interior using Gustavian-influenced designs
- Years active: c. 1770–1810
- Location: Sweden, Swedish Empire
- Major figures: Jean Eric Rehn, Louis Masreliez, Georg Haupt, Erik Palmstedt
- Influences: French Neoclassicism, Louis XVI style, Rococo, Ancient Greek and Roman art
- Influenced: Nordic Classicism, Scandinavian design

The Gustavian style (Swedish: Gustaviansk stil) is a Swedish furniture and interior design style that emerged in the late 18th century, primarily during the reign of King Gustav III of Sweden (1771–1792) and continued into the reign of his son, Gustav IV Adolf of Sweden. It is a Swedish variant of French Neoclassicism, influenced by the Louis XVI style and elements of Rococo.

The style is marked by a return to classical ideals, with a focus on restrained decoration, symmetry, and proportion. The Gustavian style is often described as a reaction against the excesses of Rococo, seeking simplicity and elegance, while maintaining classical references.

== History ==
Gustav III's Pavilion in Haga Park

The Gustavian style emerged during the reign of King Gustav III, who was instrumental in the development and dissemination of the style. After visiting Versailles in 1771, Gustav III became highly influenced by French Neoclassicism and sought to adopt elements of the Louis XVI style, but tailored to Swedish tastes and available materials. The king’s support of artists, architects, and craftsmen was key in the propagation of the style throughout Sweden during his reign. This period saw a strong cultural exchange between Sweden and France, and the king encouraged the development of Swedish art and architecture under these new influences.

Key to the development of the style was the work of designer and architect Jean Eric Rehn, who was inspired by both the French Louis XVI and earlier Rococo designs. Rehn is credited with introducing restrained and classical elements into Swedish design, such as fluted columns, straight lines, and Greco-Roman motifs. His work, alongside the contributions of other prominent designers such as Louis Masreliez and Georg Haupt, defined the aesthetic of Swedish interiors during this period.

The style initially dominated the Swedish court and noble homes, but as the middle class expanded, it began to appear in bourgeois homes as well. During the later years of Gustavian rule, especially during the reign of Gustav IV Adolf, the style began to evolve towards more simplified forms, and the influence of French decorative arts waned, replaced by greater British and Swedish design influences. This period, known as the "late Gustavian" style, saw furniture designs becoming more restrained, with square legs and plain surfaces becoming common.

== Characteristics ==
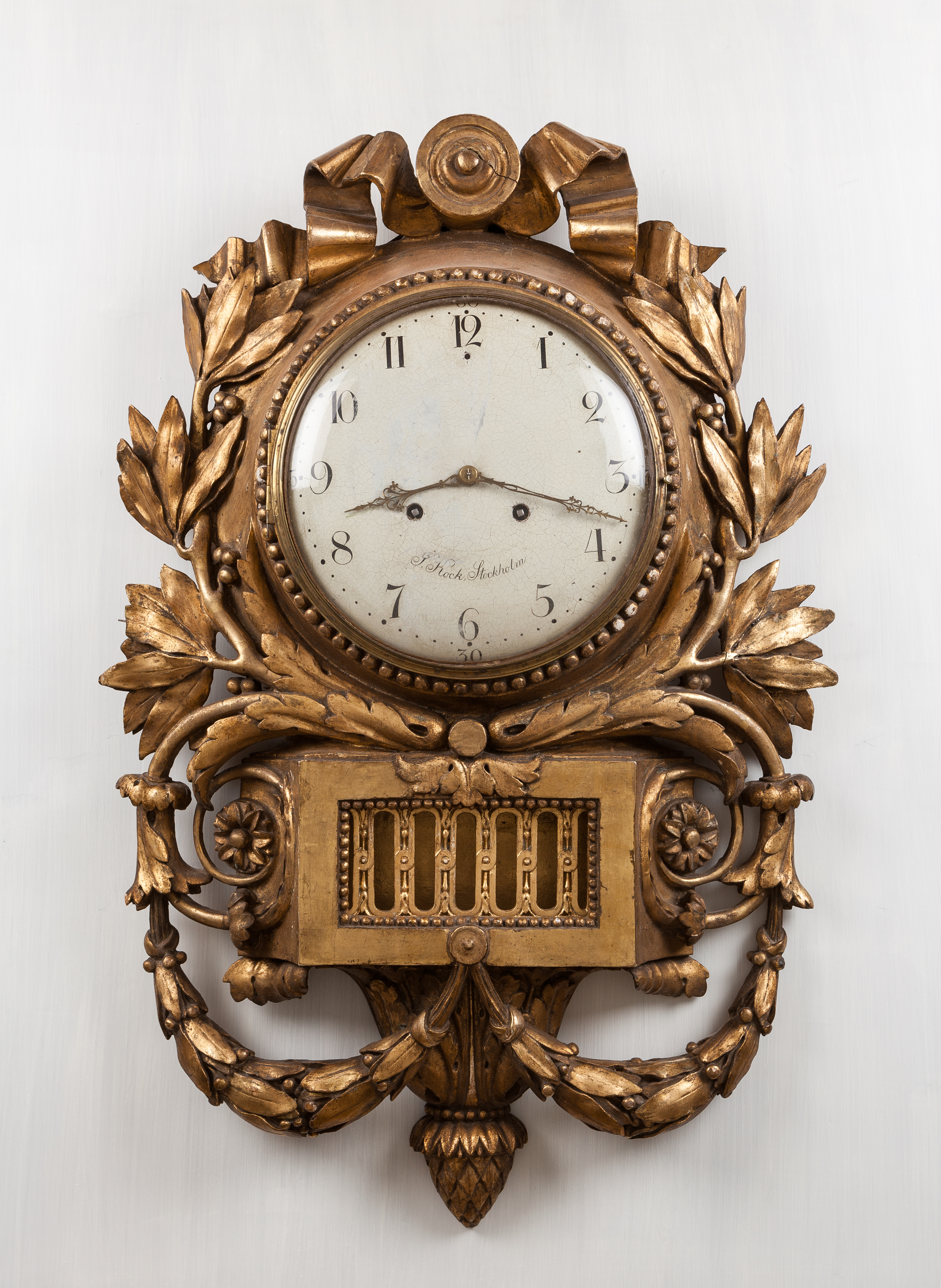
Gustavian style pendulum clock by Jacob Kock (Swedish watchmaker, 1737–1805)

The Gustavian style is primarily characterised by its adaptation of French Neoclassicism, and its relative simplicity. Key elements of the style include:

Symmetry and proportion: Following classical ideals, Gustavian design adhered to strict symmetry, with geometric shapes and balanced proportions.

Neoclassical influences: Motifs such as laurel wreaths, festoons, and Greek and Roman-inspired decorations are commonly featured in Gustavian design.

Muted colour palette: The style is often associated with light, neutral colours like whites, pale blues, greens, and soft greys. These colours evoke the appearance of marble.

Functionality: Furniture was made to be both functional and aesthetically pleasing, with straight backs, tapered legs, and minimal ornamentation. The furniture was often painted in soft pastels, which allowed for the use of local wood such as pine instead of more expensive mahogany or walnut.

The late Gustavian style is noted for its use of simpler forms. Legs and feet of furniture became square and often undecorated, and the ornamentation was toned down further.

== Architecture and Interiors ==
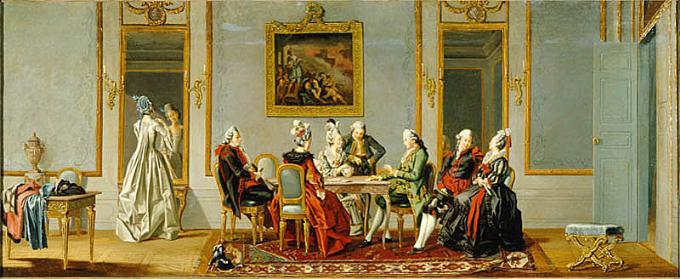
Gustavian Style Interior with Cardplayers, 1779

The Gustavian style extended beyond furniture and interior decoration to architecture as well. The period saw the construction of notable buildings in the style, such as Gustav III's Pavilion at Haga Park and Svartå Castle (Finnish: Mustion linna) in Finland. Influential architects of the period included Jean Eric Rehn, Louis Jean Desprez, and Erik Palmstedt, all of whom incorporated classical design elements into their work. Their designs often featured symmetrical layouts, classical porticos, and simple facades.

Interiors during the Gustavian period were marked by a transition from the asymmetry of Rococo to the restrained classical decoration that emphasised simplicity. While the earlier Gustavian style (c. 1772–1785) featured intricate mouldings and lighter colours, the late Gustavian style (c. 1785–1810) saw more simple forms with an emphasis on straight lines and unadorned surfaces.

== Legacy ==
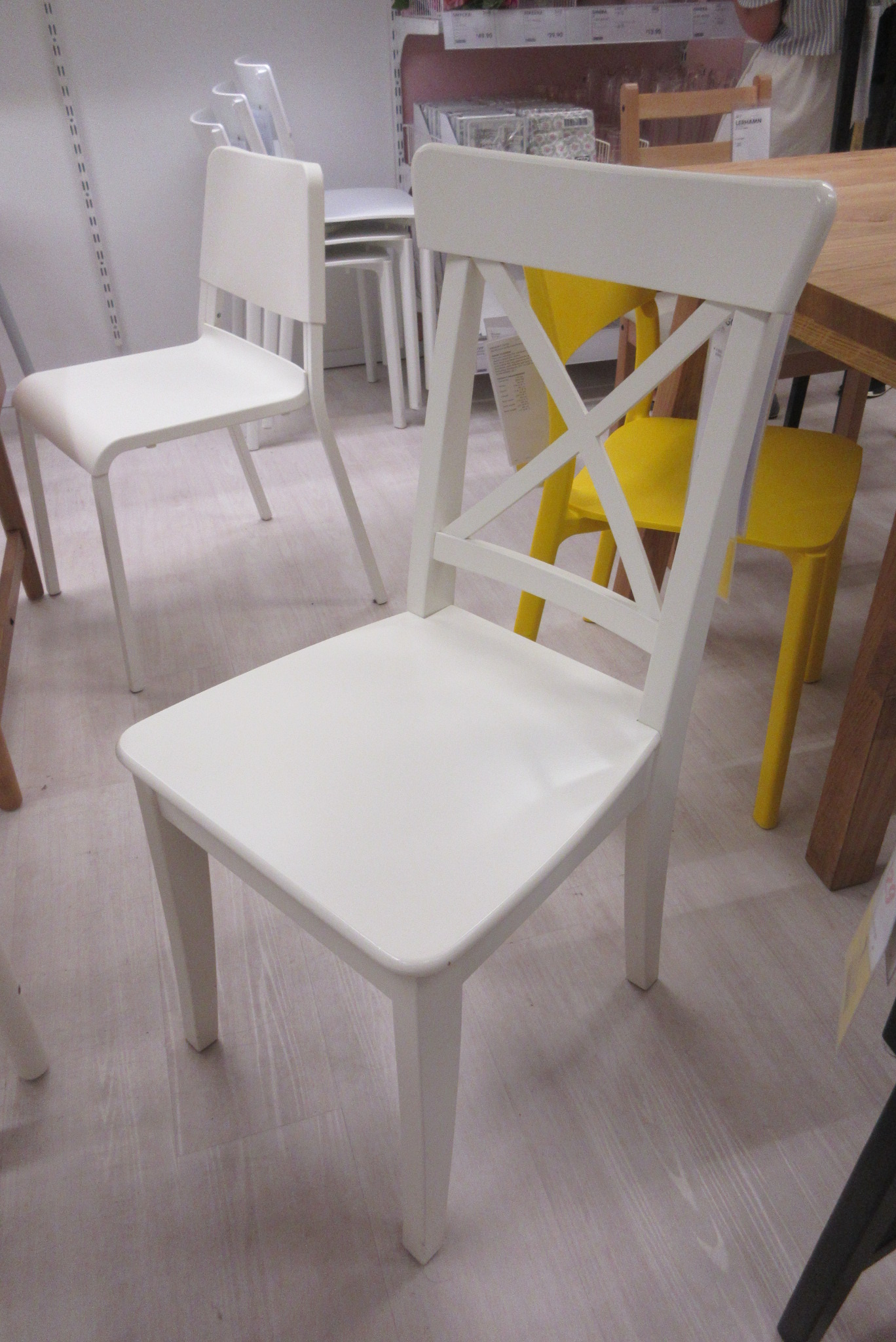
A Gustavian-inspired chair from IKEA

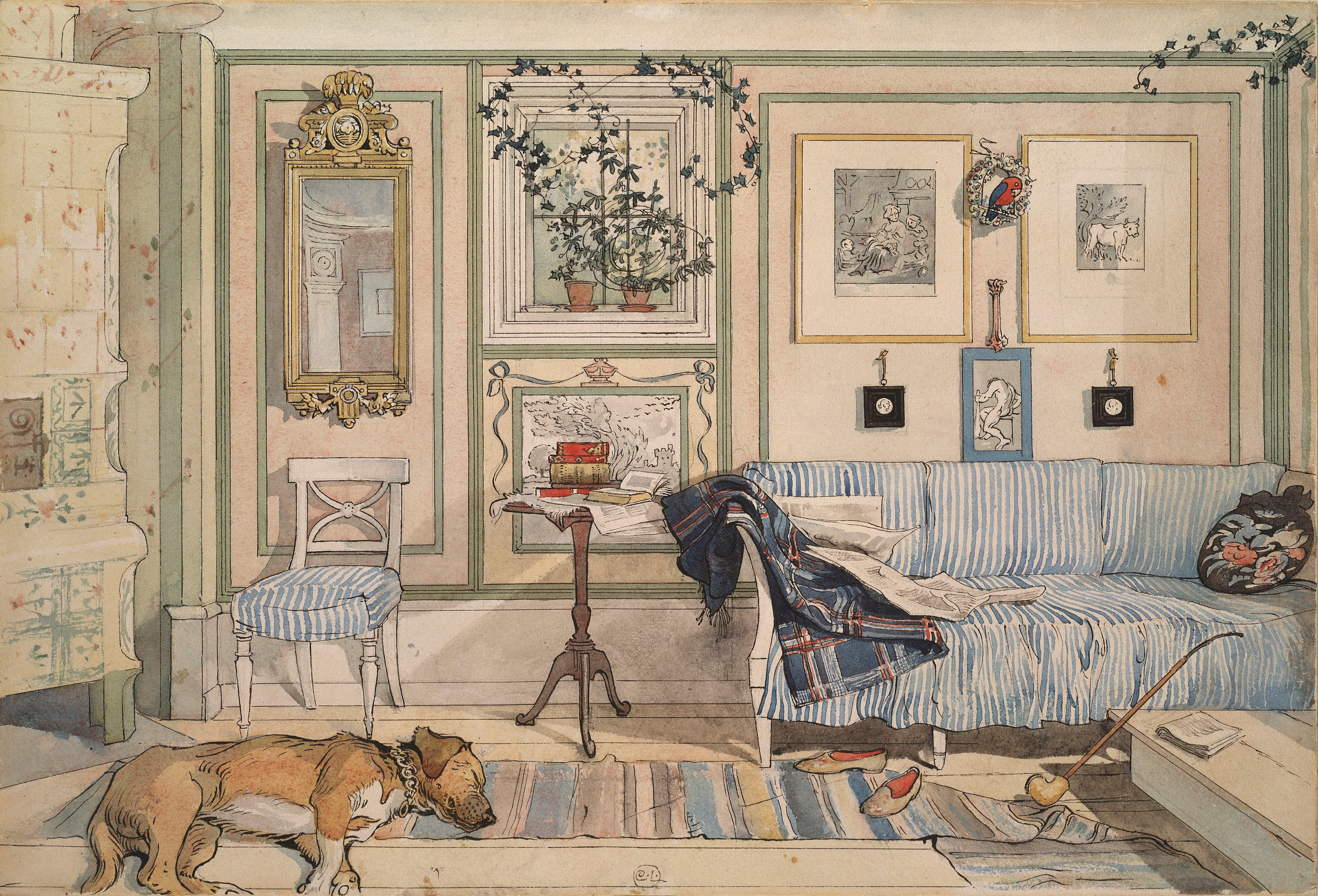
Carl Larsson home interior

The Gustavian style left a lasting legacy on Swedish interior design and architecture, and continues to influence Swedish design today. The relatively minimal aesthetic of the Gustavian style laid the groundwork for later Swedish design movements, including Scandinavian design, and the Swedish Grace and Swedish Modern styles.

Carl Larsson (1853–1919) and Karin Larsson (1859–1928) adapted the style in their home at Lilla Hyttnäs incorporating furniture and decorations characteristic of the Gustavian period.

In the late 20th century, the Gustavian style experienced a revival, particularly in the 1990s, with furniture retailers such as IKEA incorporating elements of the style into their collections. These modern reinterpretations, using less expensive materials but retaining some aesthetics of the 18th-century originals, helped introduce the Gustavian style to a worldwide audience.
