= Pehr Hilleström =

Swedish artist (1732–1816)

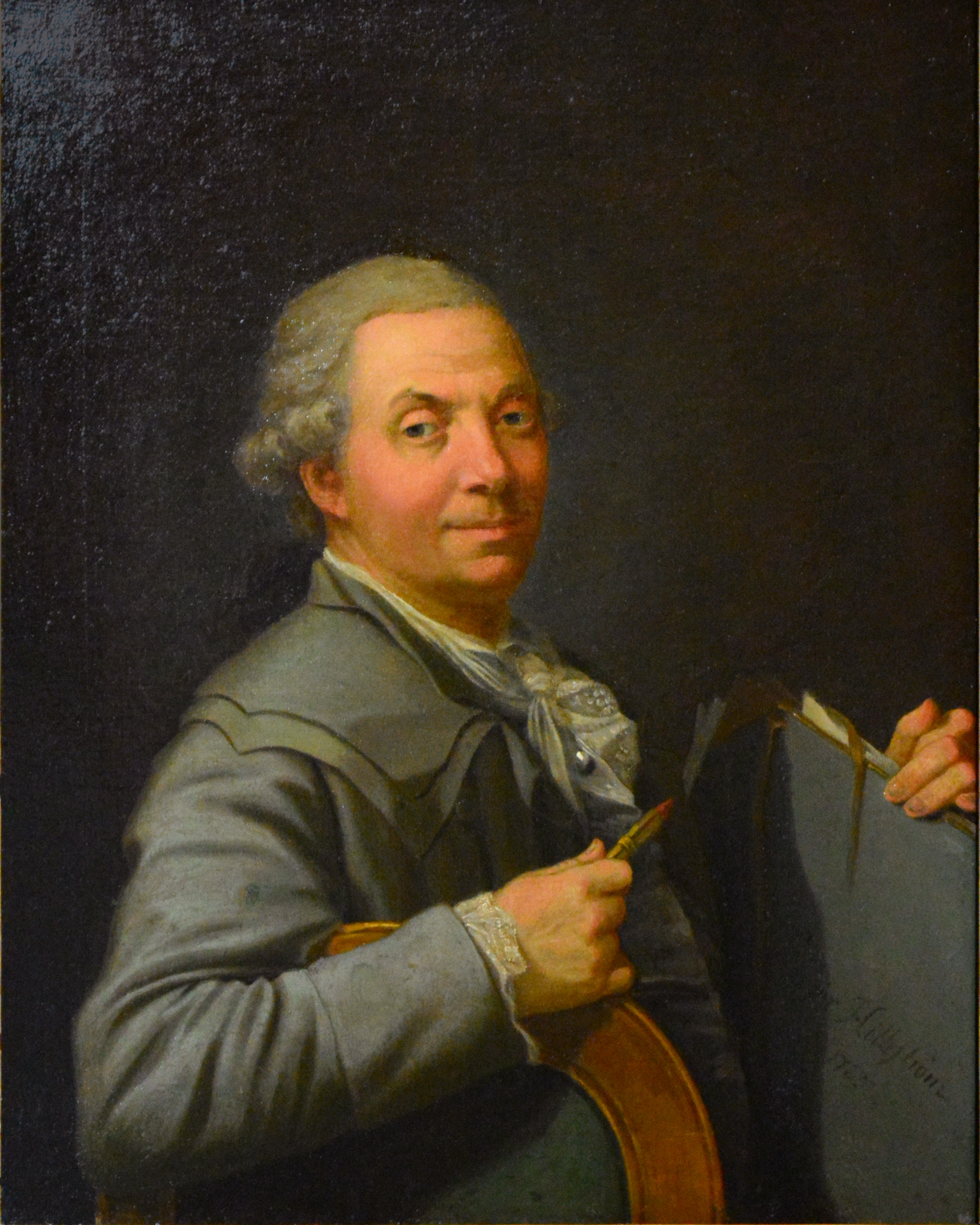
- Self portrait (belongs National Portrait Gallery, Gripsholm Castle)
- Born: 18 November 1732; Väddö, Sweden
- Died: 13 August 1816 (aged 83); Stockholm, Sweden
- Known for: Painting, Tapestry weaving

Pehr Hilleström (18 November 1732 – 13 August 1816) was a Swedish artist. He served as a professor and director at the Royal Swedish Academy of Arts.

== Biography ==
Hilleström was born on the island of Väddö in the district of Roslagen, Sweden where his uncle who was the vicar. He was the eldest of twelve children. He was first trained by landscape artist Johan Philip Korn (1727–1796). He received training at the Royal Swedish Academy of Fine Arts from artist Guillaume Taraval (1701–1750) and architect Jean Eric Rehn (1717–1793). Between 1757 and 1758, Hilleström made a study trip abroad. The journey went to Paris, Belgium and Holland. He furthered his education in the tapestry techniques and became a master tapestry weaver.

From 1759, he operated a weaving workshop in Stockholm. In 1773, Hilleström became a member of the board of the Royal Swedish Academy of Arts. The academy appointed him a professor in drawing in 1794. In 1805 he received the post of Vice-Chancellor of the academy and in 1810 he succeeded Louis Masreliez (1748–1810) as Director.

== Style ==
Hilleström painted some thirty portraits. He also performed a large number of depictions from the environments of the time. He produced numerous genre paintings of people at their daily tasks inside upper- and middle-class homes in Stockholm. Dresses and furniture were painted exactly the way they looked and provide a valuable source of information about what life was like in those days. In addition to this, he painted craftsmen in action at mills and other early industrial workplaces. In later years, he also began to paint historic paintings and religious motives.

== Personal life ==
In 1759 he married Ulrica Lode (1737–1779). Hilleström was the father of the artist Carl Petter Hilleström (1760–1812). His descendants included author and museum curator, Gustaf Hilleström (1911–1994).

== Gallery ==
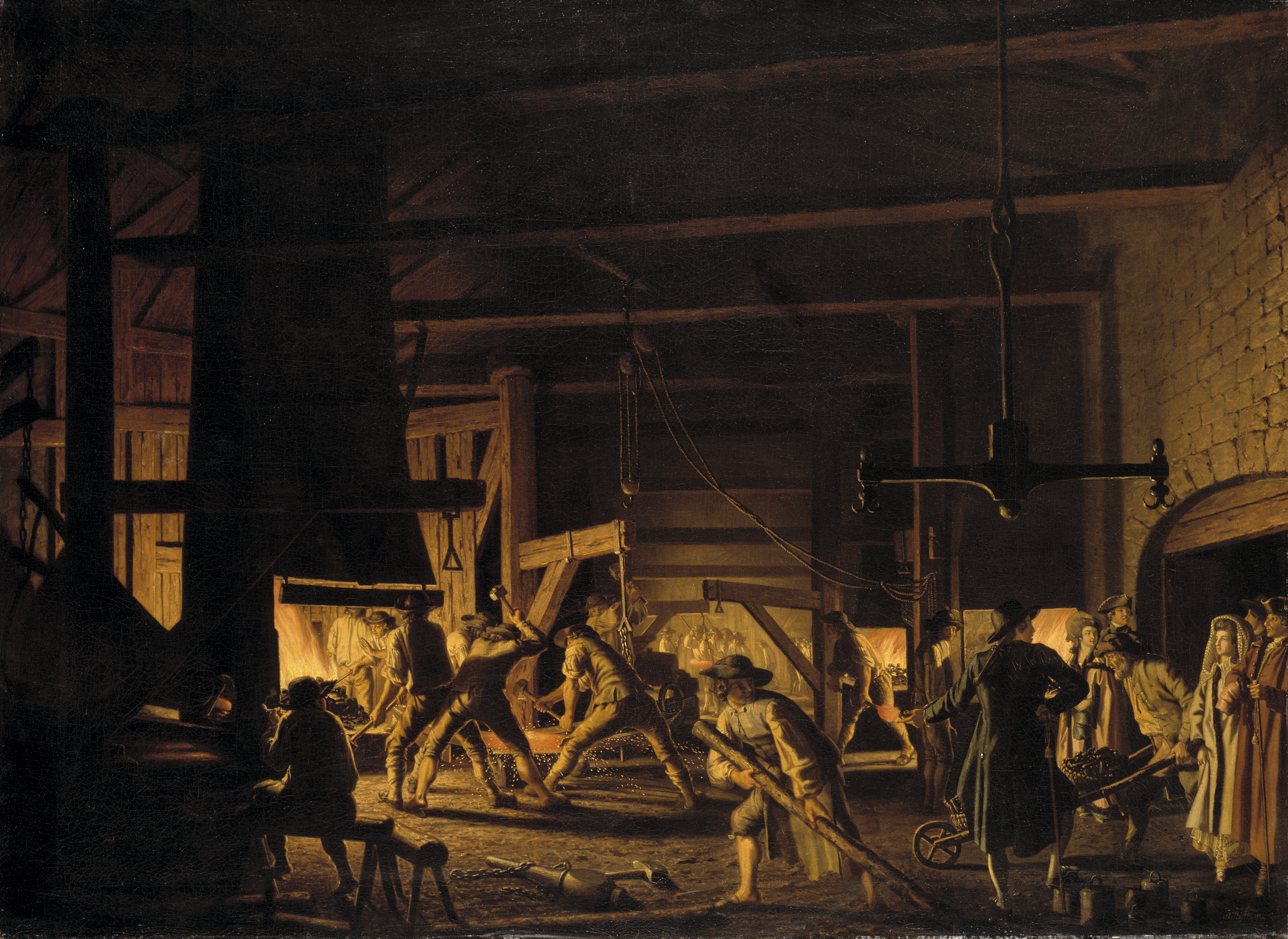
In the Anchor-Forge at Söderfors. The Smiths Hard at Work (Nationalmuseum)

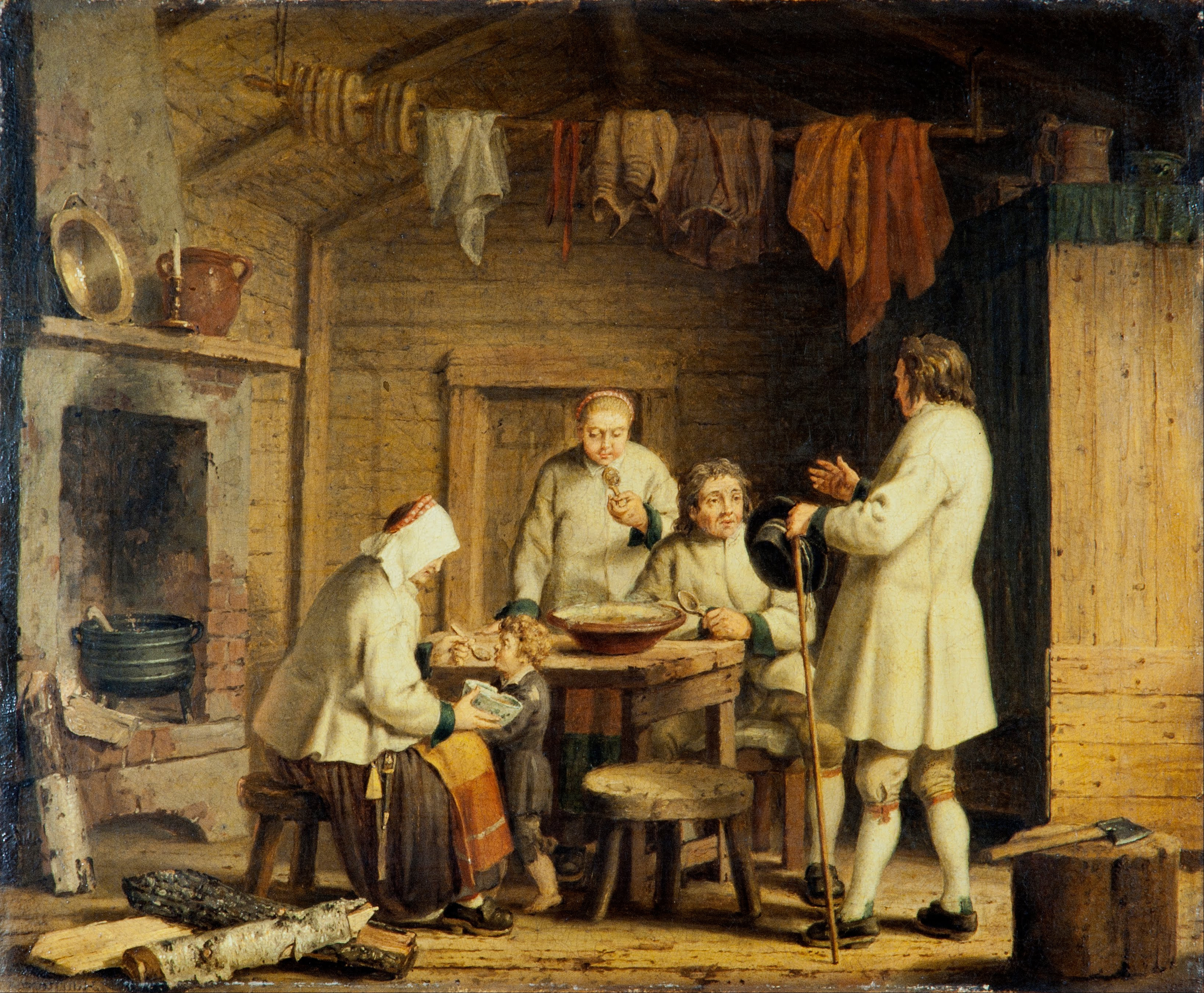
People from Mora in Dalecarlia

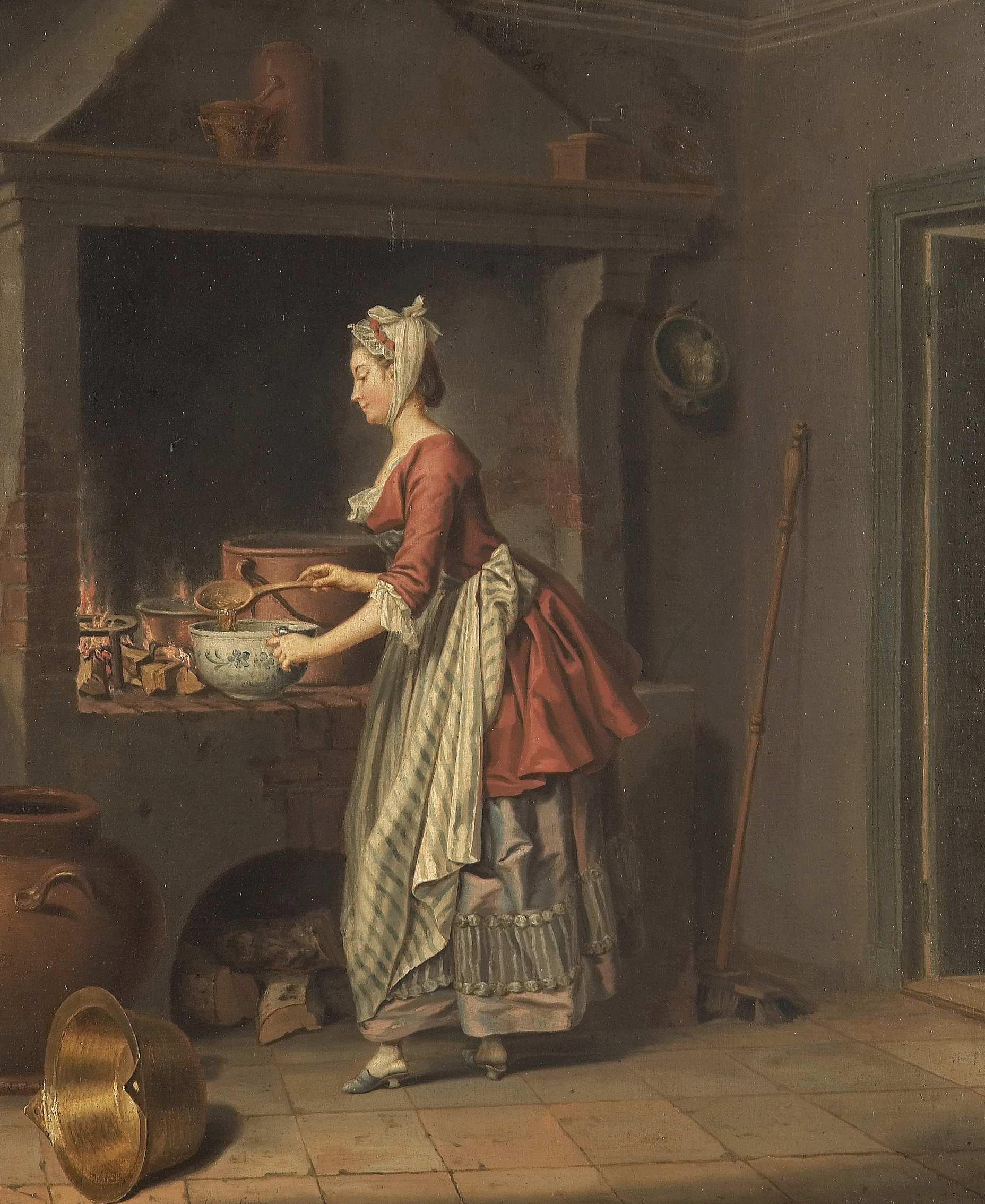
A maid taking soup from a pot

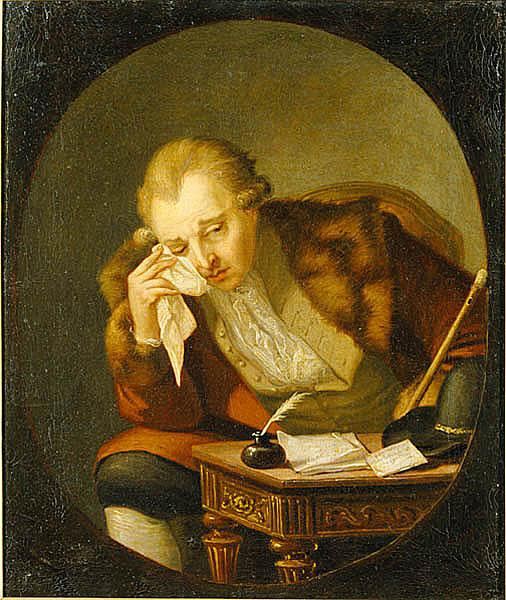
Portrait of Carl Michael Bellman

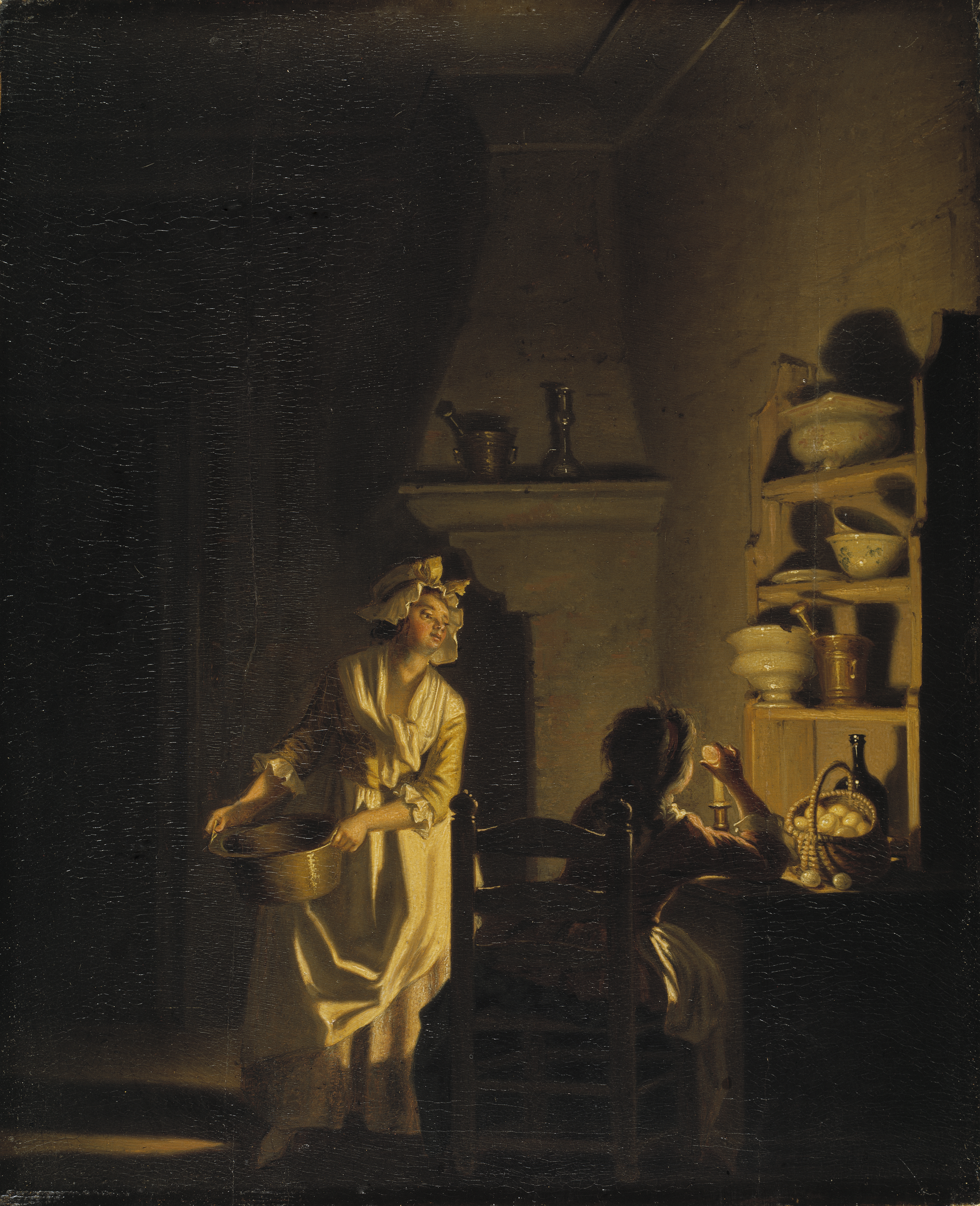
Egg testing

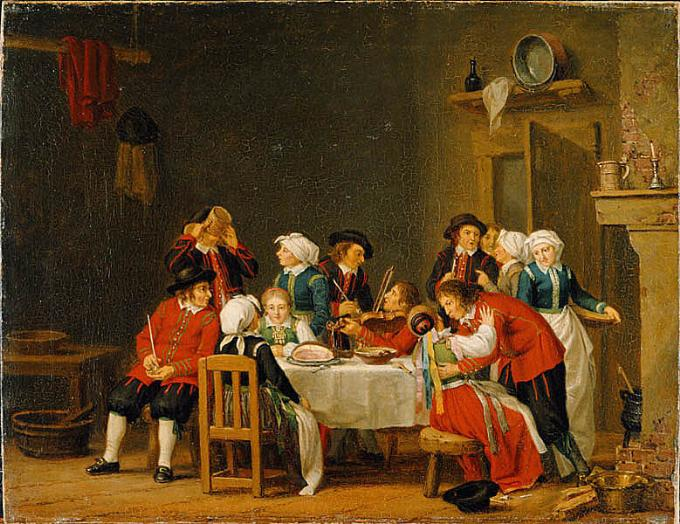
Convivial Scene in a Peasant's Cottage

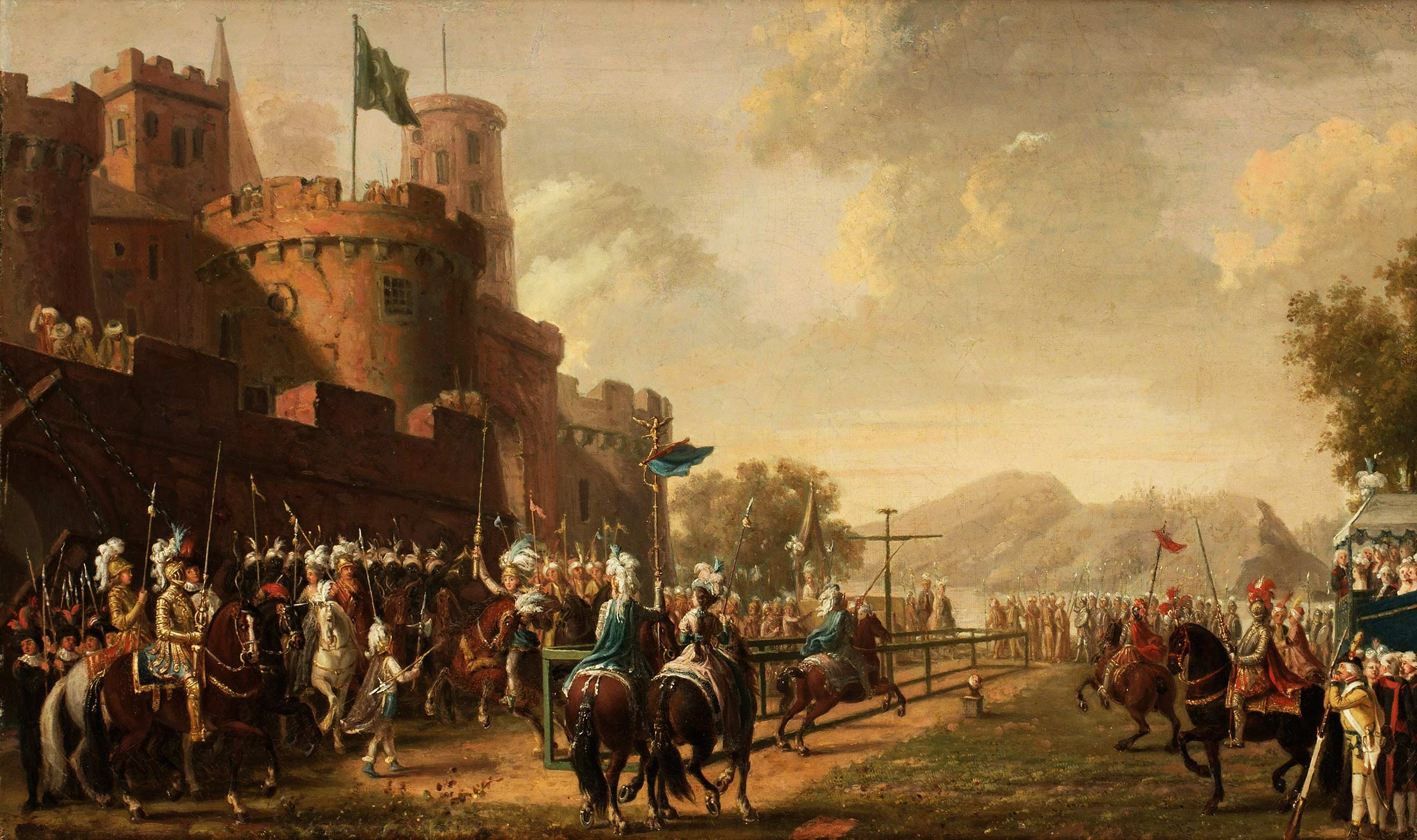
The enchanted forest, tournament at Drottningholm

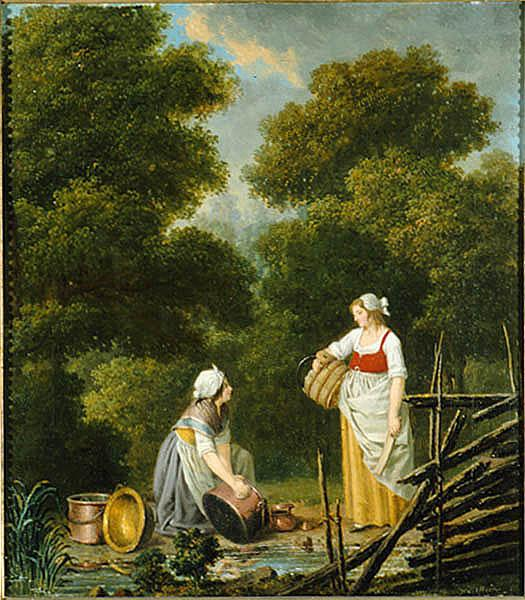
Two Maid-Servants at a Brook

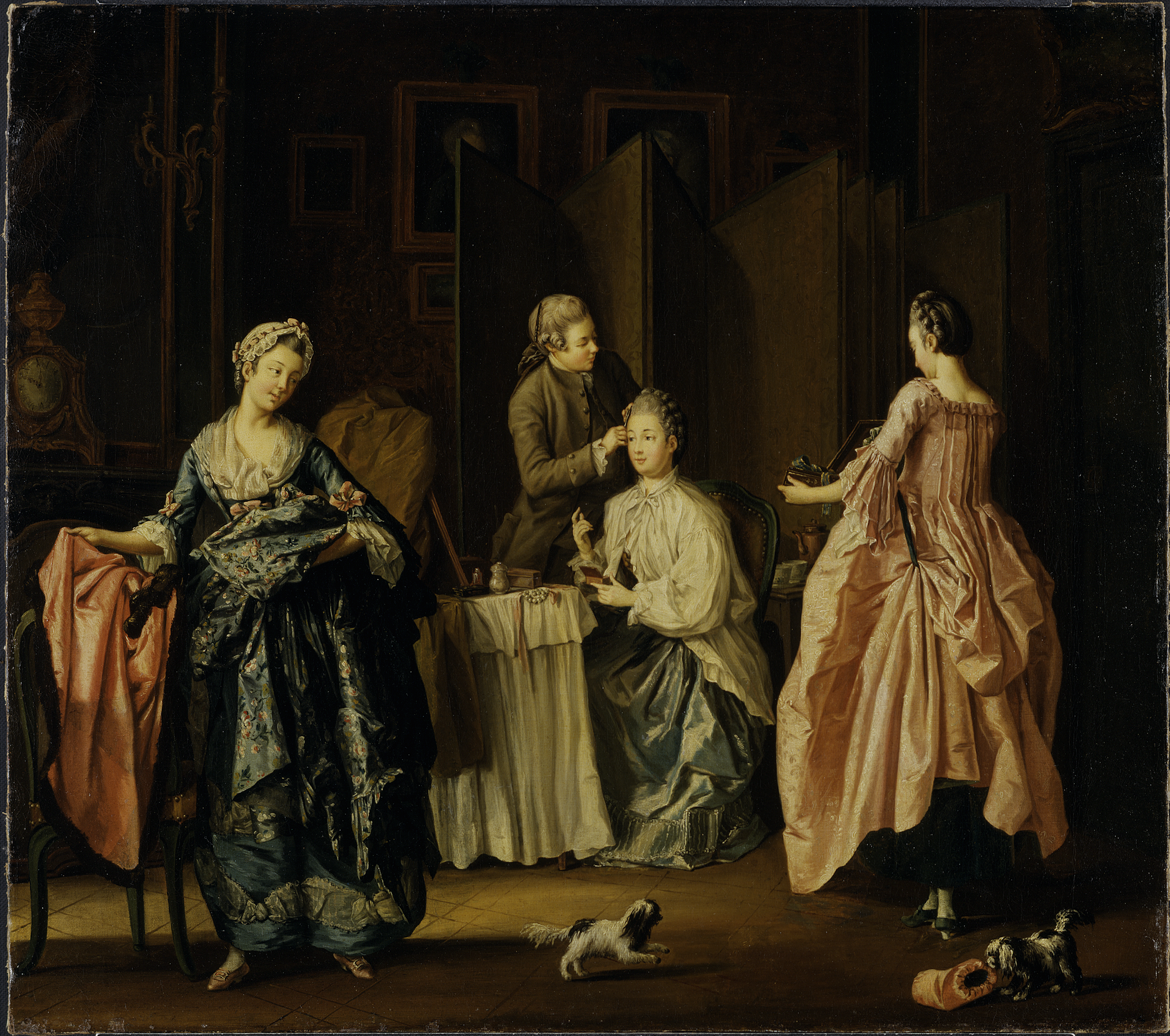
The Morning Toilet

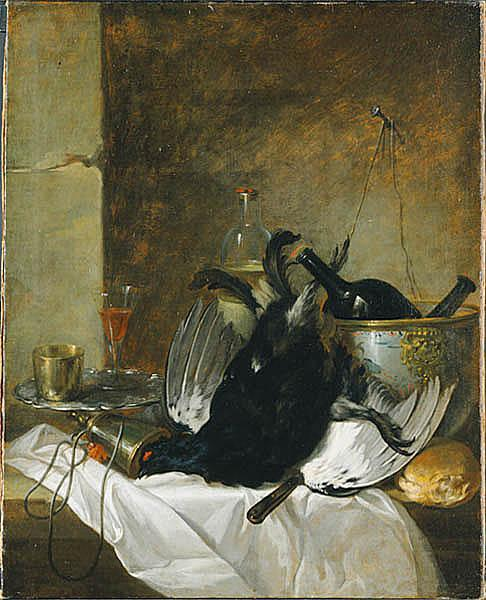
Still Life

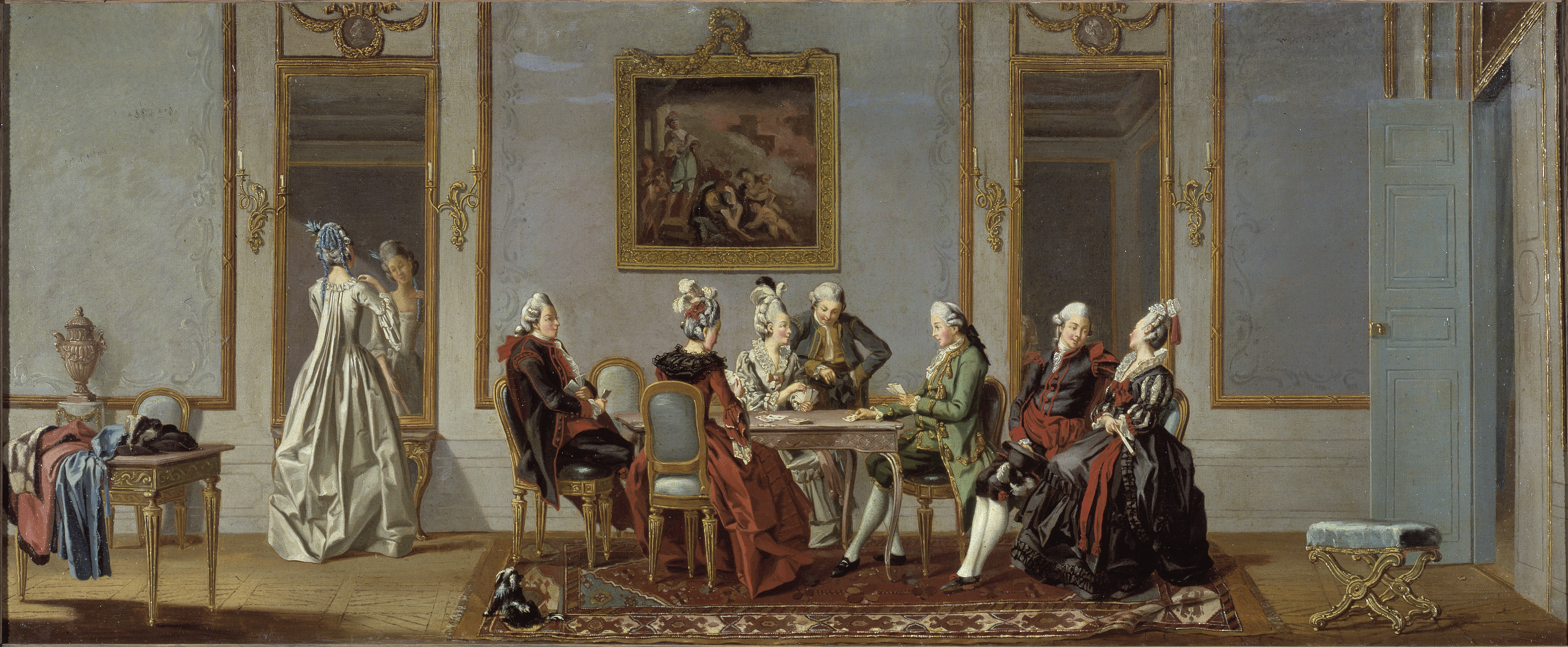
Gustavian Style Interior with Cardplayers, c. 1779

== Other sources ==
- Pehr Hilleström in Nordisk Familjebok (in Swedish)
- Historiesajten.se (in Swedish)
