= Masreliez =

Family of French origin with a Swedish branch

Masreliez is a family of artists of French origin.

Some members of the Masreliez family traveled to Sweden in the 18th century, called to Sweden by King Gustaf III to decorate his castles during the golden age of France-Sweden relations. The first member of the family to go, Jacques Adrien Masreliez (1717-1806) from Grenoble, traveled to Sweden in 1748 to decorate the chapel of the royal castle; the library of Louisa Ulrika at Drottningholm Palace, where the Swedish royal family lives today; the king's bedroom at Gripsholm; and the organs of the Uppsala Cathedral. He also introduced the French Rococo style to Sweden. Both of Jacques' sons Louis Adrien (1748-1806) and Jean Baptiste Edoard Barbe (1753-1801) continued the tradition.

Masreliez, family, descended from the castle sculptor Jacques Adrien Masreliez (ca 1717-1806), probably born in Paris . He was the father of Louis Adrien Masreliez and Jean Baptiste Edouard Barbe Masreliez. The latter's son merchant Edward Adrian Masreliez (1797 - 1857) was the father of Protocol Secretary Wilhelm August Masreliez (1834–90).

The son of the latter was Gustaf Wilhelm Masreliez (1880-1964), who was promoted to the Court of Appeal Judge of Appeal in 1916. Gustaf Masreliez became auditing secretary in 1919 and was Director General of the Bureau of Prisons 1927–36. He was Sheriff in Sollentuna and Färentuna, Stockholm 1936-47 and member of Sthlms City Council 1921–38. Gustaf Masreliez's son, interior designer and art dealer Erik Gustaf Masreliez (1912–66) (Father of Peter Erik Gustav Masreliez and Grand Father of Jonas Peter Erik Masreliez) and the Head of En employer association's expert unit for medical and occupational hygiene issues. Also Chief Physician at Telefon AB Ericsson. Nils Masreliez (f 1916).

Gustaf Masreliez was the brother of the alderman in Stockholm Karl William M (1875-1937). Karl M was in turn the father of the former alderman in Stockholm Gösta M (1909-1990). A cousin of Karl Gustaf and M was the father of Curt Jean Louis Edward M (1919–79). Curt M was in 1939 an actor at various theaters in Helsingborg, Stockholm, Uppsala and Gothenburg and participated from 1942 in a variety of films. In recent years, he was best known by TV Theatre. Cousin of him was Commercial Lennart M (f 1918).

- Jacques Adrien Masreliez (1717 -1806)
- Jean Baptiste Edouard Barbe Masreliez (1743 - 1801)
- Edward Adrien Masreliez (1797 - 1857)
- Wilhelm August Masreliez (1834 - 1890)
- Gustav Wilhelm Masreliez (1880 - 1964)
- Erik Gustav Masreliez (1912 - 1966)
- Peter Erik Gustav Masreliez (1943 - 1986)
- Jonas Peter Erik Masreliez (1972 - )
- Sebastian Jonas Masreliez (2011 - )

A few other notable members of the family are:

- Curt Masreliez (1919–1976), a Swedish actor.
- C. Johan Masreliez (1939– ), a physicist known for robust statistics as assistant professor at University of Washington and a non-standard cosmology.
- Marie-Louise Masreliez (1977- ), a Swedish contemporary circus artist and stage director.
- Jonas Peter Erik Masreliez (1972- ), an award-winning Swedish graphic artist and web designer, father of Sebastian Jonas Masreliez (2011-) and Mila Juliette Masreliez (2013-) and son of late Peter Erik Gustav Masreliez, who served as an Officer and pilot for the Swedish Royal Navy 1963–1986.
