= Södertuna =

Castle in Sweden

- Gnesta Municipality, Södermanland County, Sweden
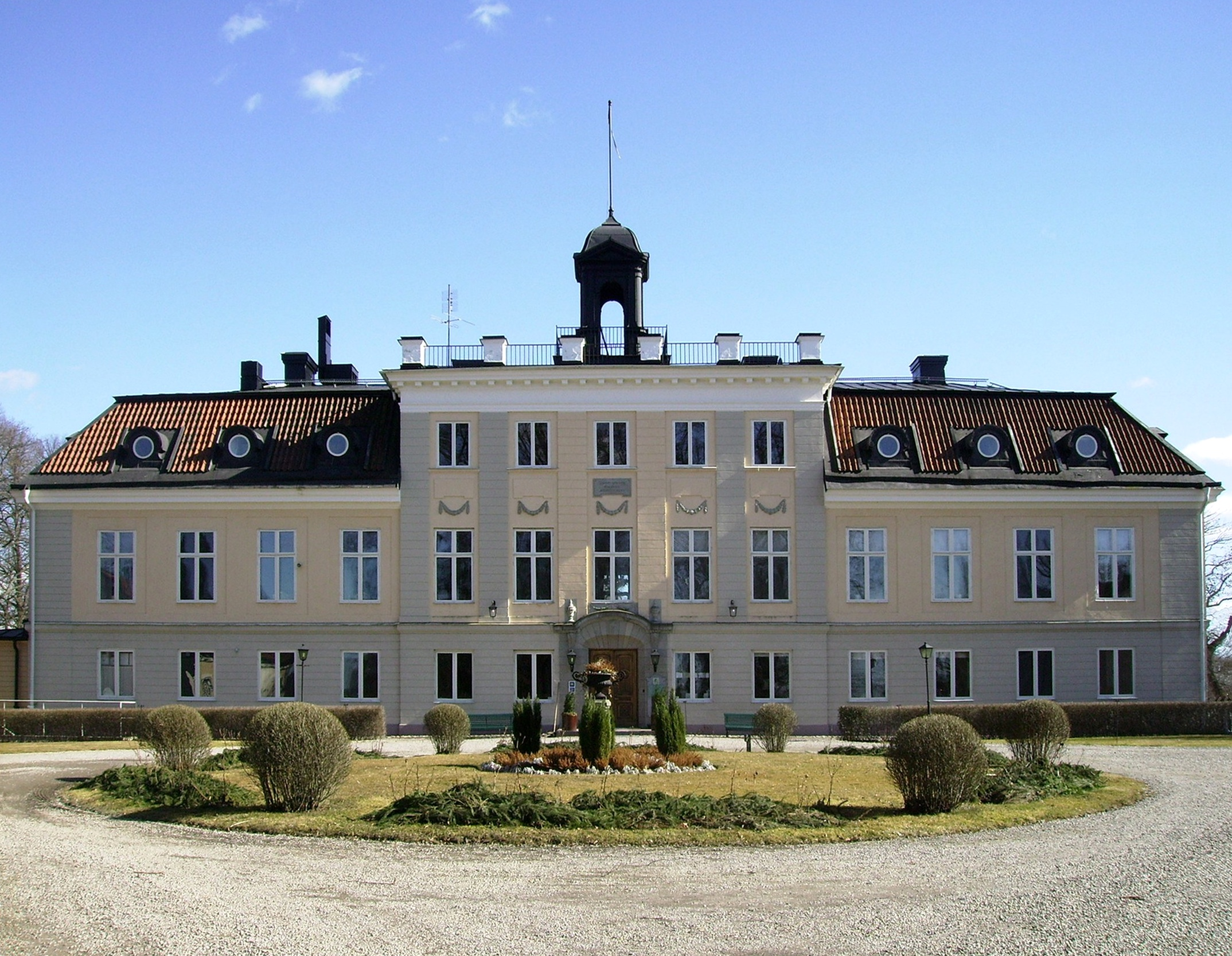

Site information
- Type: Castle

Location
- Coordinates: 59°04′06″N 17°18′18″E

Södertuna (Swedish pronunciation: [sœdɛˈʈʉ̂ːna]) is a medieval castle located on a small island in Lake Frösjön in Gnesta Municipality, Sweden. It dates to the 14th century and is now a luxury hotel and conference center. The main building is of medieval origin, but was updated during the 17th century and the late 18th century. The last major renovation was in 1892.

It has belonged to members of several families: Sparre, Lovisin, Palmenfelt, Ehrensvard, Wachtmeister, Adelborg, and von Eckermann.

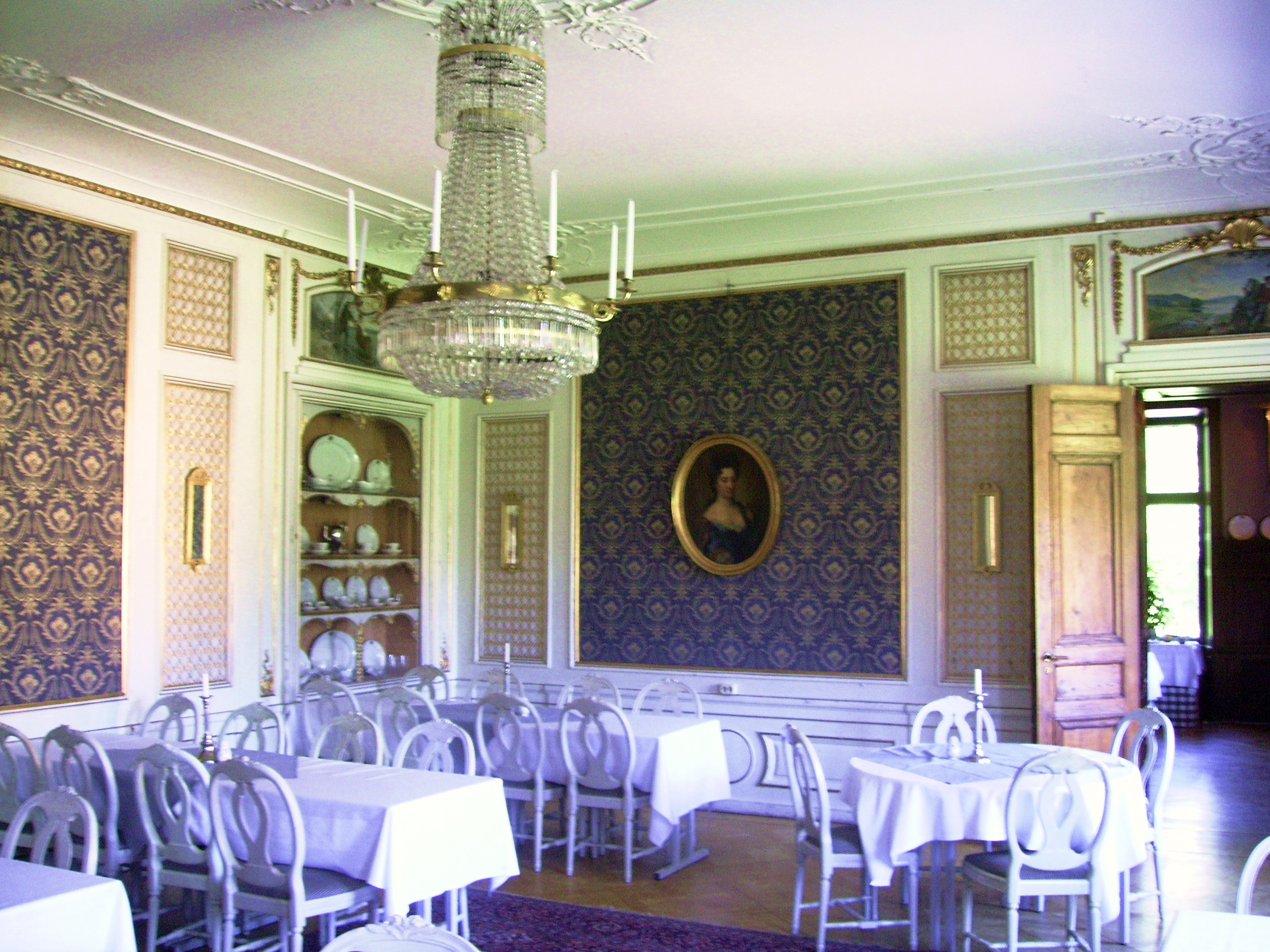
Interior

The castle and the park were split off in 1985 by the von Eckermann family. The new owners, together with an additional couple of Norwegian investors, made the palace into a hotel and conference center, which was inaugurated in 1986 by Princess Christina. In 2007 the castle was sold to the Åström family, which also operates Dufweholms Manor Inn and Gripsholm.

== See also ==
- List of castles and palaces in Sweden
