= Jean Eric Rehn =

Swedish architect, engraver and designer

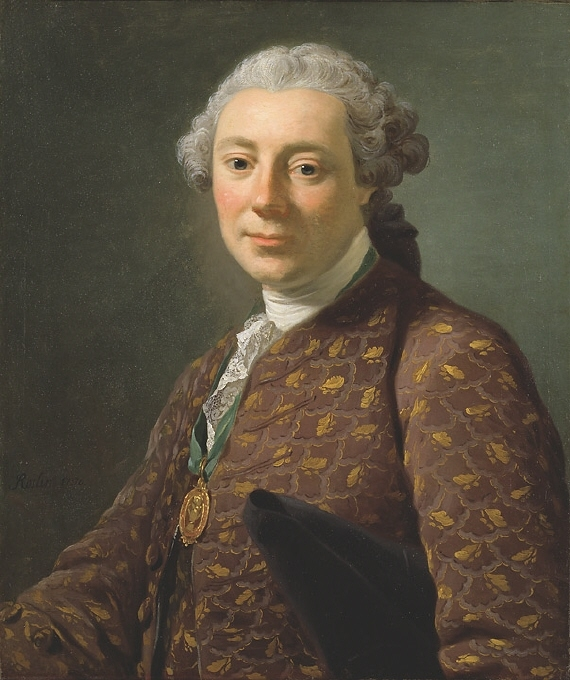
Jean Eric Rehn; portrait by Alexander Roslin (1756)

Jean Eric Rehn (18 May 1717, Stockholm - 19 May 1793, Stockholm) was a Swedish architect, engraver and designer.

== Biography ==
His father, Eric, was a government ombudsman for the Sámi people. While still a boy, he became part of the Swedish Fortification Corps, a forerunner to the engineering corps, where he served as a Sub-Lieutenant. In 1740, at the age of twenty-three, he went to Paris to study etching, with the help of a government grant. There, he worked in the studios of Jacques-Philippe Le Bas, creating hunting scenes. In 1745 the architect, Carl Hårleman, made contact with him on behalf of the Swedish government, offering him a position creating designs for the silk, wool and linen factories supported by the Manufakturkontoret, and related facilities.

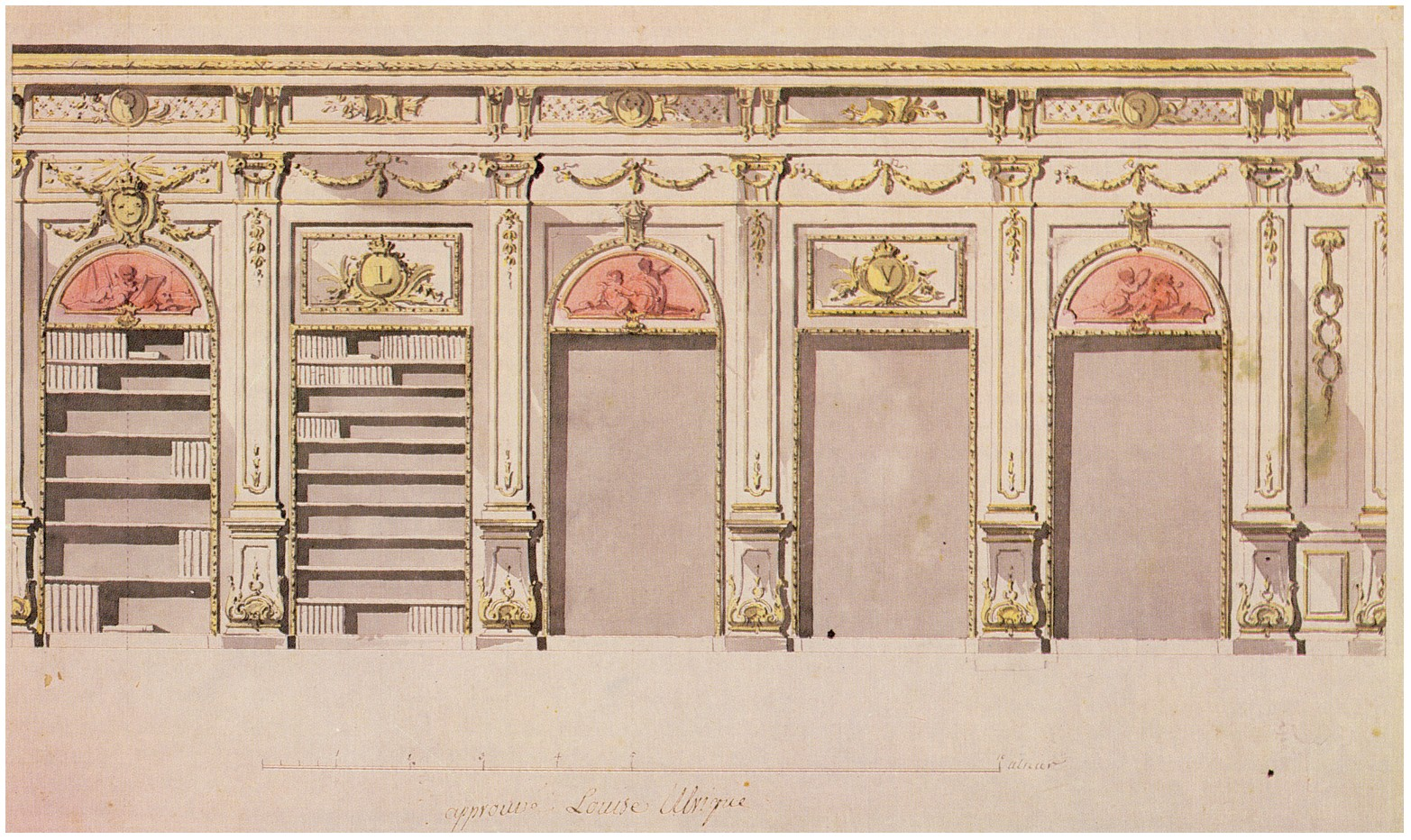
Design for the library at Drottningholm Palace

In addition to his work at the factories, he made designs for jewelers, carpenters and the Rörstrand Porcelain company; designed wallpaper for the French weavers employed by the Royal Family and made engravings for medals. He also served as drawing teacher for Crown Prince (later King) Gustav III and his brothers. Later, he set up an engraving school and became an employee of the Överintendentsämbetet (Superintendent's Office) in 1753.

Two years later, at the expense of Queen Louisa Ulrika, he accompanied the painter, Johan Pasch, to France and Italy. He returned after sixteen months and was named a Professor of the Royal Drawing Academy in 1757.

He was heavily employed by the Royal Court as well, doing interior design work for Queen Louisa at Drottningholm Palace. Later, in 1779, he oversaw the changes at Gripsholm Castle and Stockholm Palace, which had been ordered by King Gustav III. He also redecorated parts of the Bollhuset (1772) and designed furniture with Georg Haupt.

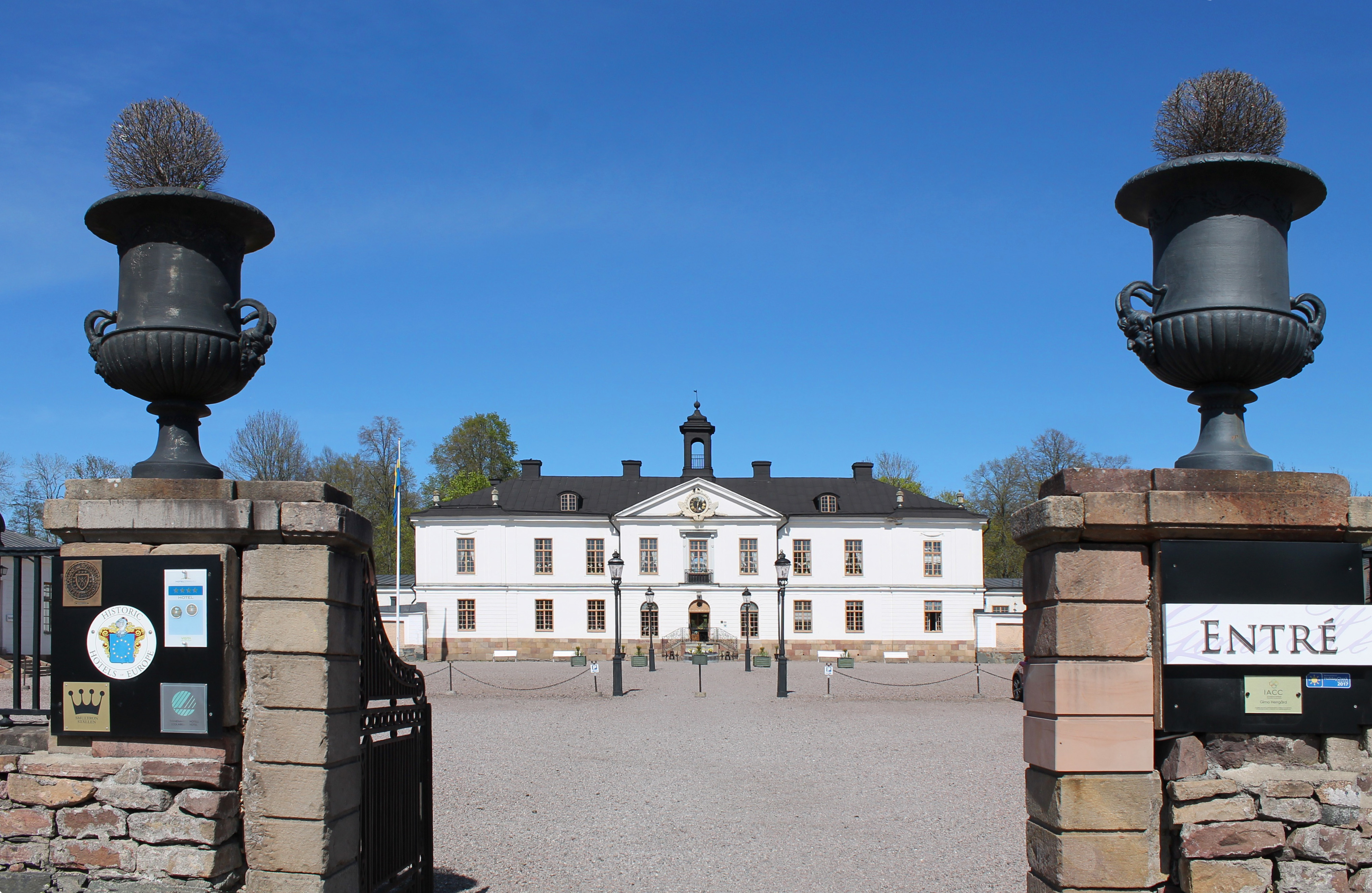
Gimo Manor

Although he is mostly remembered for his interior work, his building designs were also significant. Around 1760, he was hired by the industrialist, Charles de Geer, to design a library, aviary and two new wings for his home in Lövstabruk. He also made drawings for Stora Wäsby Castle and Ljung Castle, among others.

He had resigned all of his official positions by 1789, but was still active as an engraver; visiting Rome to draw the ancient buildings there. His works are represented at the Nationalmuseum and the Gothenburg Museum of Art.

== Sources ==
- Biography @ the Svenskt biografiskt lexikon
