= Erik Palmstedt =

Swedish architect

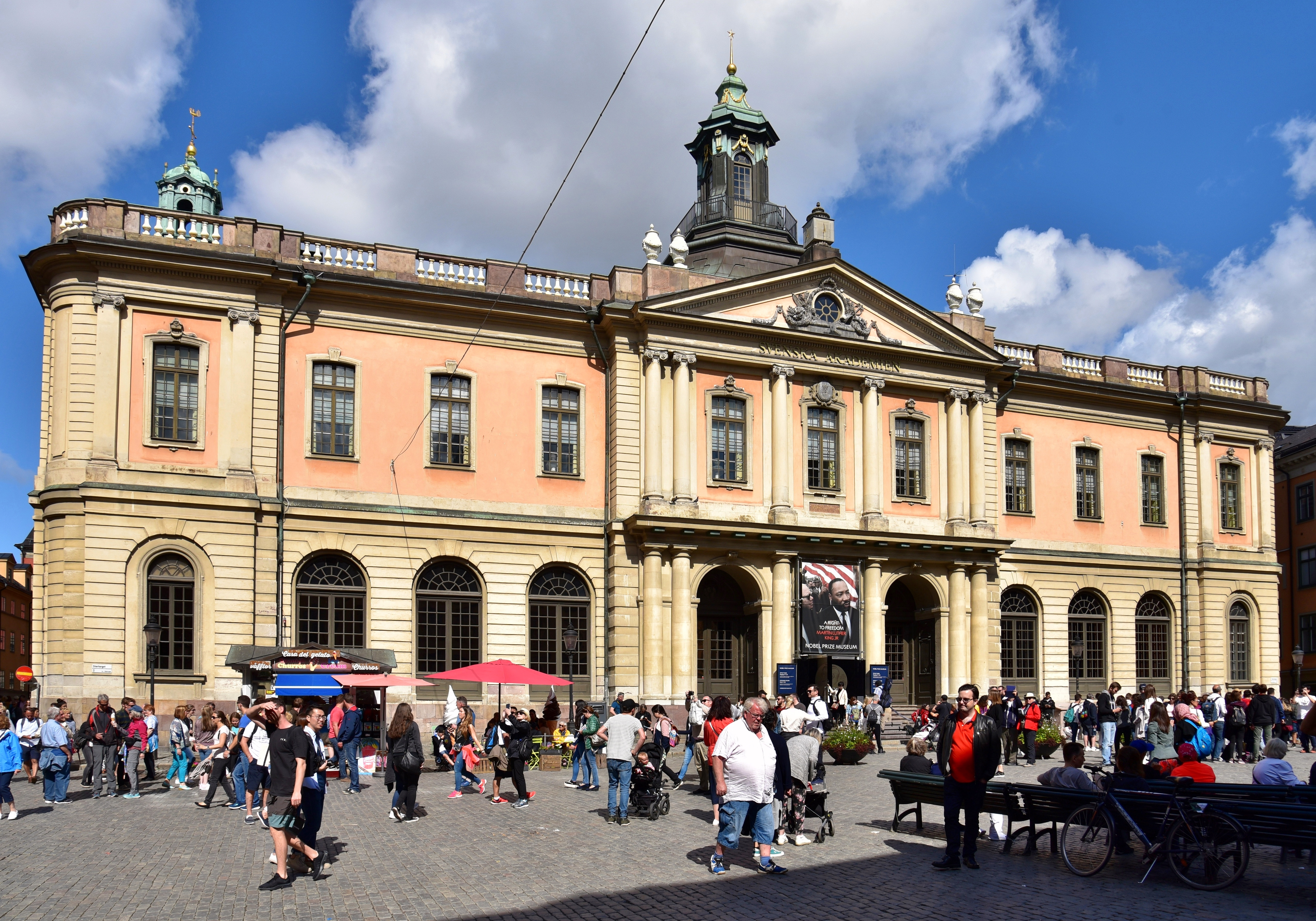
Stockholm Stock Exchange Building (Börshuset), (1767-1778)

Erik Palmstedt (16 December 1741 in Stockholm – 12 June 1803) was a Swedish architect working for the court circle of Gustav III, where he was in the forefront of Neoclassical style and at the heart of a social and intellectual circle that formed round him. He was also a musician, who served as organist at Riddarholm Church for twenty-seven years.

== Early life and education ==
Erik Palmstedt was born in Södermalm on December 5, 1741, according to the Julian Calendar in use at that time (December 16, 1741 according to the Gregorian Calendar later adopted and currently in use.) He was the son of court musician Johan Palmstedt and his wife Maria Segerlund.

At the age of seven, Palmstedt began to attend Maria Church School, where one of his schoolmates was the future Swedish writer of songs Carl Michael Bellman, who became his lifelong friend.

At the age of 14, Palmstedt became a pupil of Stockholm's city architect, Johan Eberhard Carlberg. In an assessment written when Palmstedt was 19, Carlsberg praised him for his "unusual wisdom, labor and diligence."

== Career ==
As early as 1760, Palmstedt's name appears on architectural drawings for eight buildings in Södermalm, which had suffered a major fire in 1759.

After the death of Carlberg in 1773, Palmstedt became Stockholm's vice-architect, a position he would hold until the end of his life. (It was Karl Henrik König who succeeded Carlberg as chief architect.)

Having intently studied recent developments in architecture through the medium of engravings, in 1778-80 he was able for the first time to travel to France and Italy to study architecture at first hand. Through his marriage in 1784 to Hedvig Gustafva Robsahmsson, he was rendered financially independent. The circle that gathered at their house on Svartmannagatan included noted Swedish songwriter Carl Michael Bellman and the composer Joseph Martin Kraus.

He was made a fellow of the Swedish Academy of Fine Arts in 1791; he was also a member of the Royal Academy of Music.

== Notable works ==
- Börshuset, (Stockholm bourse), 1767-1778 (illustration).
- Gripsholm, the Court Theatre, 1781, inspired by Palladio's 16th century Teatro Olimpico
- Norrbro, the old "North Bridge", Stockholm, rebuilt in stone, in partnership with Carl Fredrik Adelcrantz, 1781-1807
- Tullhuset, the Customs Warehouse along Skeppsbron, Stockholm, 1783-1790
- Svartå slott, 1783-1792
- Arvfurstens palats, for Princess Sophia Albertina, Stockholm, 1783-1794. Today it houses the Swedish Foreign Office.
- Levin's villa, Riddarholmen, after 1771
- Skinnskattebergs herrgård, begun in 1775
- Heby castle, around 1780
- Hildebrandska huset (House of Hildebrand), 1780-1800
- Stortorgsbrunnen, 1778
- Tyska brunn, 1785
- Palmstedt's hus (House of Palmstedt), 1801
- Fållnäs gård, 1780-1807
- Dalarö tullhus, 1788
- Söderfors church, 1789-1792
- Gamla Riddarholmsbron (The old bridge of Riddarholmen), 1784-1789 (demolished 1867)
- The Stockholm Pantheon, begun in 1791 (incompleted)
