= Frösjön =

Lake in Sweden

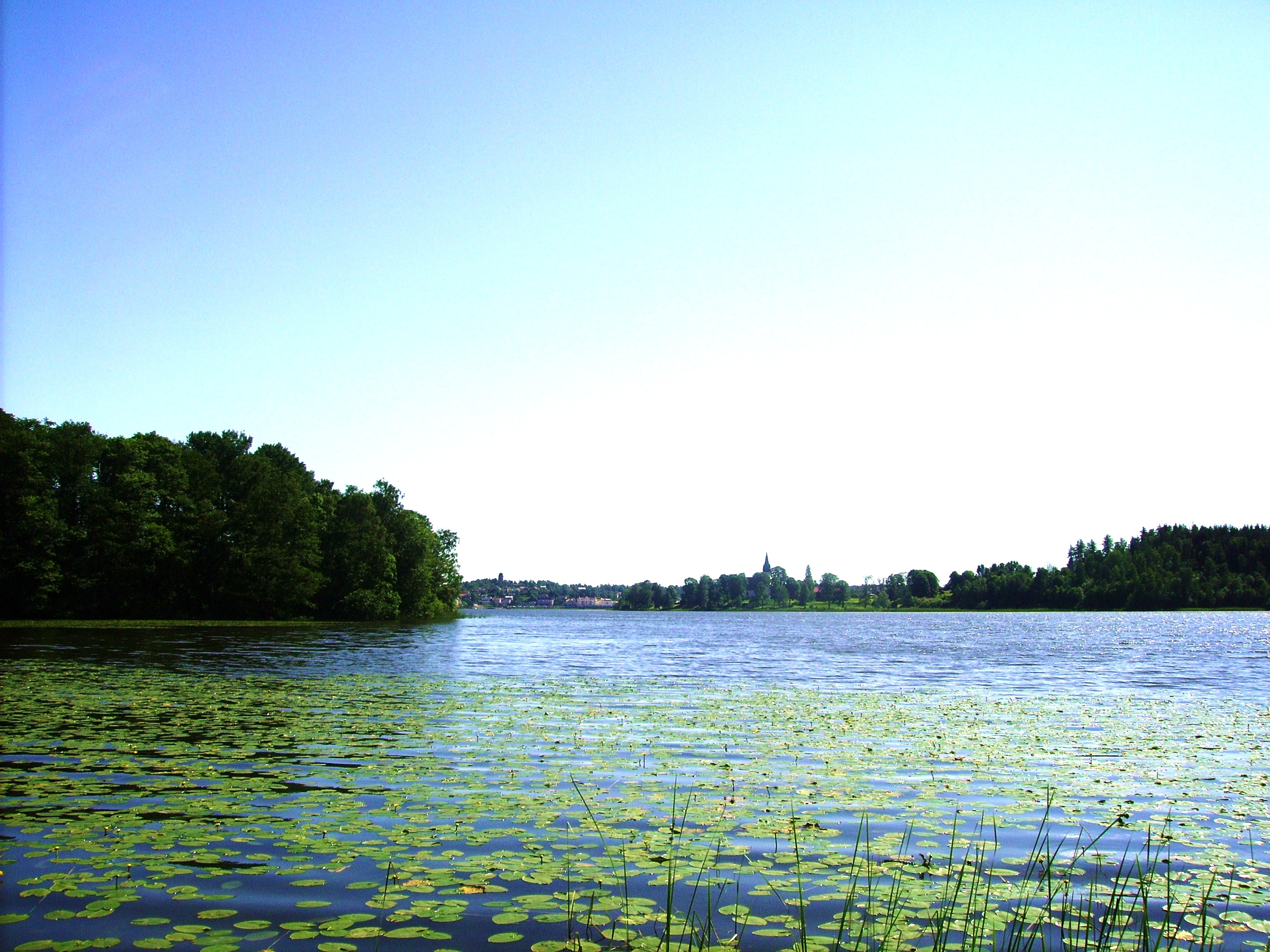

- Location within Södermanland
- Coordinates: 59°3′30″N 17°19′30″E
- Basin countries: Sweden

Frösjön is a lake in Södermanland, Sweden, which straddles the boundary between Gnesta Municipality and Stockholm Municipality. It is 5.8 metres deep and has a surface area of 3.46 square kilometres.
