= Adrien Masreliez =

French artist (1717–1806)

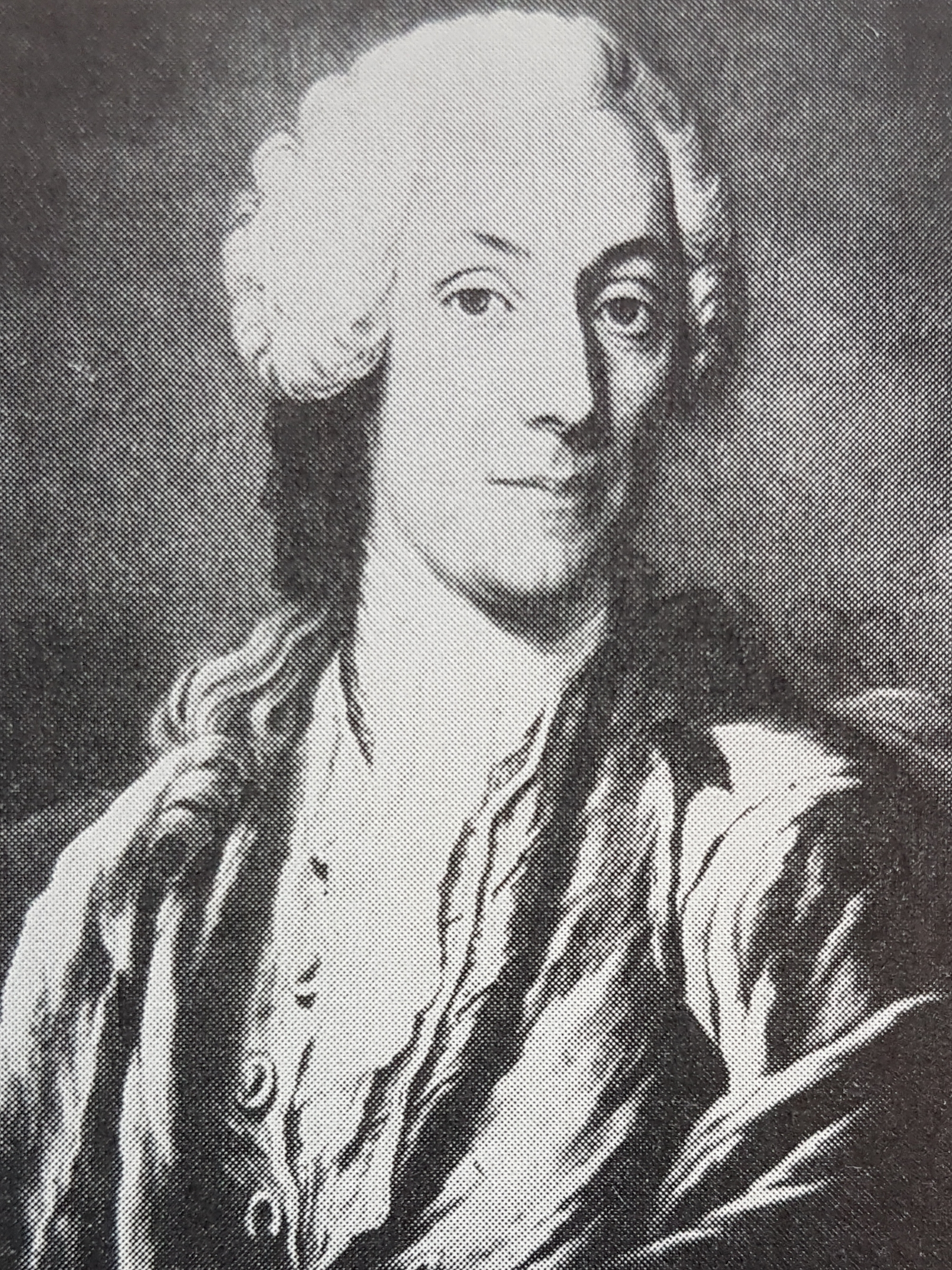
Jacques Adrien Masreliez

Jacques Adrien Masreliez (Grenoble 15 May 1717 - 28 October 1806) was a French ornamental sculptor called to Sweden in 1748 to head the interior decoration of the new Royal Palace in Stockholm. The work involved the completion of 250 rooms in anticipation of the royal family moving into the Palace. Masreliez also headed the decoration work at the Drottningholm Palace and the theatre at Drottningholm, and produced work in other palaces and manors in the vicinity of Stockholm, and in the Cathedrals of Gothenburg and Uppsala.

Masreliez was for many years responsible for the training of young artists at the new Academy of Arts, a position that came with that of royal ornamental sculptor (kunglig ornamentsbildhuggare). When he retired in 1776, he was succeeded in both positions by his son Jean Baptiste Masreliez. He was elected a fellow of the academy in 1773. Another son of his was Louis Masreliez. Both sons were to continue his work on the Royal Palace.
