= Jean Baptiste Masreliez =

Swedish sculptor

Jean Baptiste Edouard Barbe Masreliez (31 August 1753 – 25 May 1801) was a Swedish sculptor. Born the son of the French-born sculptor Jacques Adrien Masreliez, he was trained under his father and studied in France before being called back to participate in the decoration of the interiors of the Royal Palace in Stockholm. His "most remarkable contribution" (according to Meyerson) was the interiors for Carl Fredrik Adelcrantz's new opera house in Stockholm. He succeeded his father both as teacher at the Royal Swedish Academy of Arts and as Royal Sculptor in 1776 and was given the honorary title of professor in 1790.
