= Louis Masreliez =

Swedish painter (1748–1810)

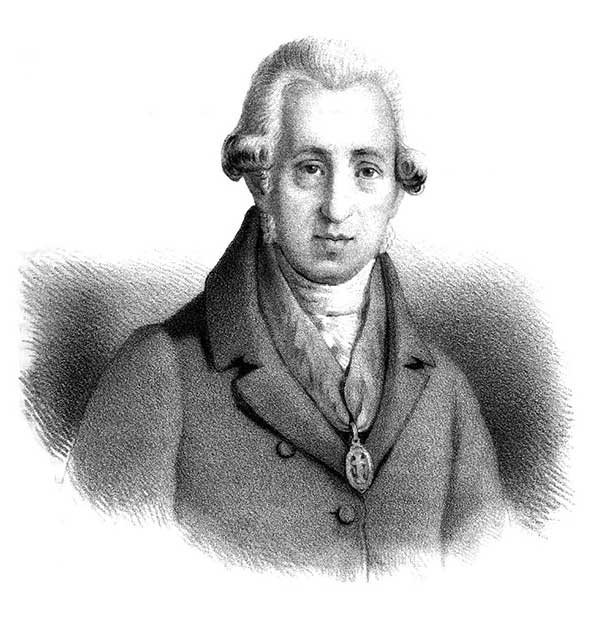
- Born: 1748; Paris
- Died: 1810 (aged 61–62); Stockholm
- Other name: Adrien Louis Masreliez
- Occupation: Painter

Louis Masreliez (1748 – 19 March 1810), born Adrien Louis Masreliez, was a French-born, Swedish painter and interior designer.

== Biography ==
Masreliez was born in Paris and came to Sweden at the age of 5 in 1753. He was the son of French ornamental sculptor Adrien Masreliez (1717–1806) and the elder brother of sculptor Jean Baptiste Masreliez (1753–1801).

He began his education at the Royal Swedish Academy of Fine Arts (Ritakademien) at the age of 10. Since the academy did not teach painting, he studied in Stockholm at the workshop of ornament painter Lorens Gottman (1708–1779).

In 1769 he was given a study grant which he used to travel to Paris, Bologna and Rome to study. In Rome he spent time with several of the French, Italian and German artists who would shape the Neoclassicism decorative style. In 1783, Louis Masreliez was called back to Sweden after his twelve-year absence. Following his returned to Sweden, he became a member (ledamot) of the Royal Swedish Academy of Arts. The following year he was made a professor of art history. He became rector of the Academy in 1802 and director in 1805.

His work is represented in the Swedish Nationalmuseum, the Gothenburg Museum of Art, and the Royal Palace.

== Selected works ==
- Interior of Gustav III's Pavilion at Hagaparken in Solna (1792)
- Interior of Tullgarn Palace (Tullgarns Slott) in Södermanland (1790s)
- Altar paintings of:
  - Adoration of the Shepherds at Maria Magdalena Church (Maria Magdalena kyrka) in Stockholm (1800)
  - Commemorative motifs at Romfartuna Church (Romfartuna kyrka) near Västerås in Västmanland (1769)
  - Santo Stefano, Venice (Chiesa di santo Stefano) in Diocese of Alessandria, Italy
- Restored suite of rooms at in Hotell Östergötland at Salviigränd in the Gamla Stan in Stockholm; created for the tradesman Wilhelm Schwardz (1791).

== See also ==
- Masreliez
