= Georg Haupt =

Swedish cabinet maker

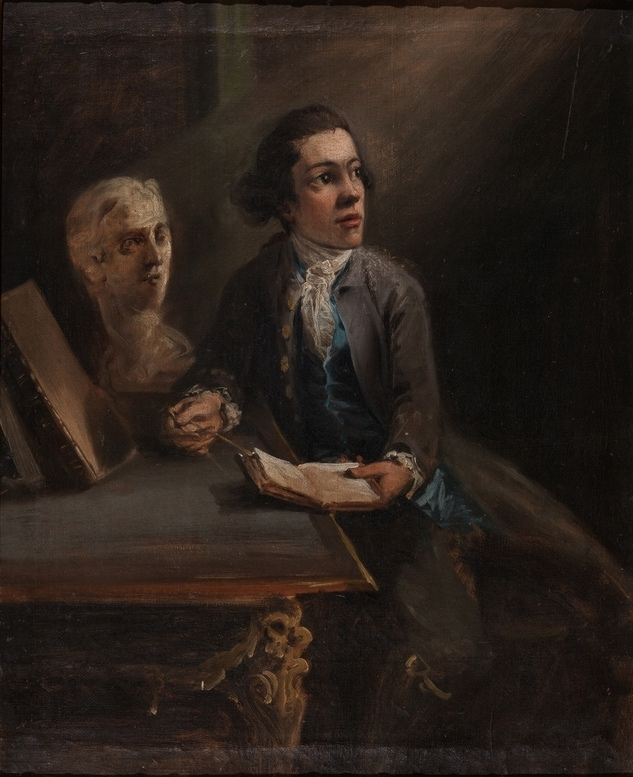
- Porträtt av Georg Haupt sittande vid ett skrivbord. Målning från omkring 1775 av Elias Martin.
- Born: 10 August 1741
- Died: 18 September 1784 (aged 43)
- Occupation: Joiner, Ébéniste, artist

Georg Haupt (10 August 1741 in Stockholm – 18 September 1784 in Stockholm) was a Swedish cabinet maker. Haupt was the son of a Nuremberg carpenter and learnt his trade as an apprentice of Johan Conrad Eckstein in Stockholm, after which he travelled as a journeyman to Amsterdam, Paris and London. He became cabinetmaker to King Adolphus Frederick in 1769 and a master carpenter and burgess in Stockholm in 1770 and 1771, respectively.

== Biography ==
Haupt learnt his trade during a period when the French rococo had established itself in Swedish furniture design, but came to Paris in 1764, when the neoclassical style later known under the name of Louis XVI had started to gain ground. Details of his life in Paris are scarce but he was probably employed in the workshop of Simon Oeben, the brother of the better-known Jean-François Oeben. He had come to London at some point before early February 1768, and may have been independently active as a cabinetmaker—a possibility thanks to the more liberal trade regulations in England—and remained there until July 1769, when his appointment as cabinetmaker to the King prompted him to return to Stockholm. His first royal commission was to be a desk intended as a gift for the Queen. After some pressure from the King, the Stockholm carpentry guild allowed him to use the completed piece to qualify as a master, even though there were Stockholm journeymen older than him waiting for their turn. Having been allowed into the Guild in 1770, he became a burgess in Stockholm the following year, establishing a workshop in rented premises at Trumpetarbacken, Norrmalm, which during the following years would employ three and later four journeymen and a few apprentices and produce furniture for the royal court and the Swedish social and economic elite. His reputation increased after his finishing of a mineral cabinet (depicted) for the Prince of Condé.

Haupt's style was characterized by detailed intarsia combining different woods of varying colour and structure. Even though Haupt's own furniture never reached outside the elite that could afford his prices, his style was popularized by a number of contemporaries and his influence on Swedish furniture making was great during his own lifetime. Original pieces by Haupt can be found in the Nodiska Museet, Stockholm. This style was later reintroduced in Sweden by Evald Hermansson (1902 - 1972) from the 1930's to the 1950's using a variety of woods and veneers

Soon after his sudden death from a stroke in 1784, fashion moved towards a more simplified style. After his death, his widow, Sara Catharina Thuring, continued to run the workshop until she remarried one of her husband's former journeymen, Gustaf Adolf Ditzinger, who had at that point recently become a master.

== Work ==
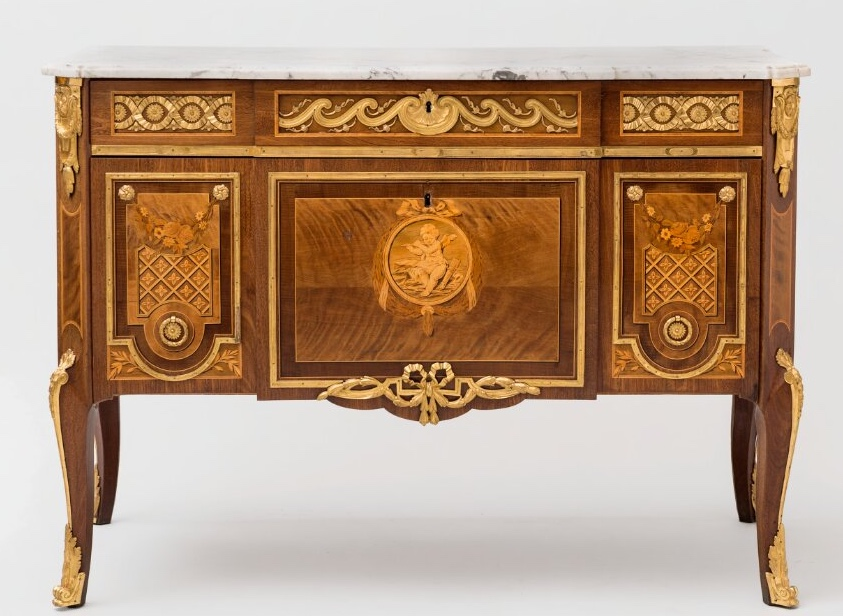
Chest of drawers made by Haupt in 1780.

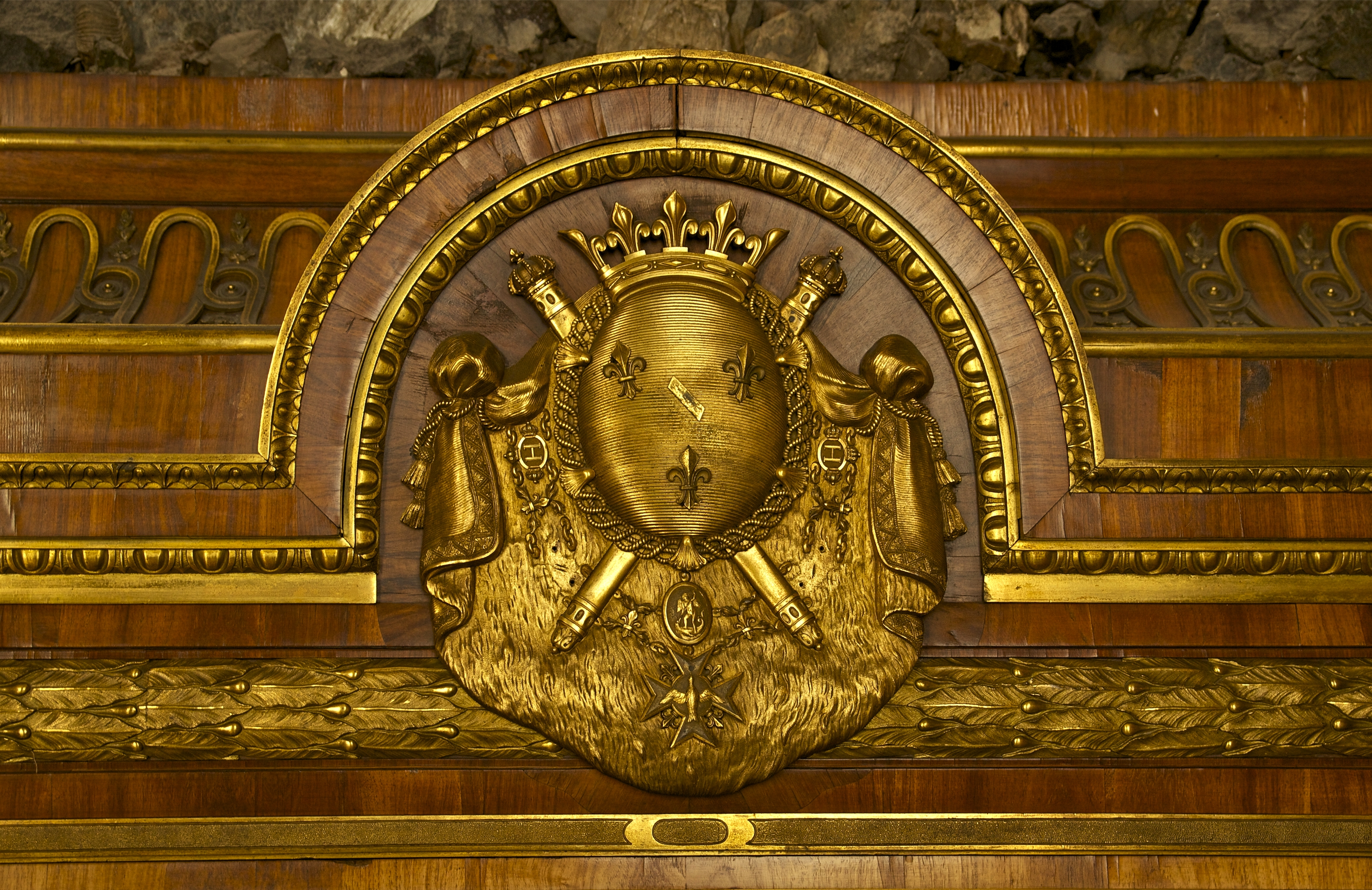
Detail of Haupt's mineral cabinet for the Prince of Condé (1774).

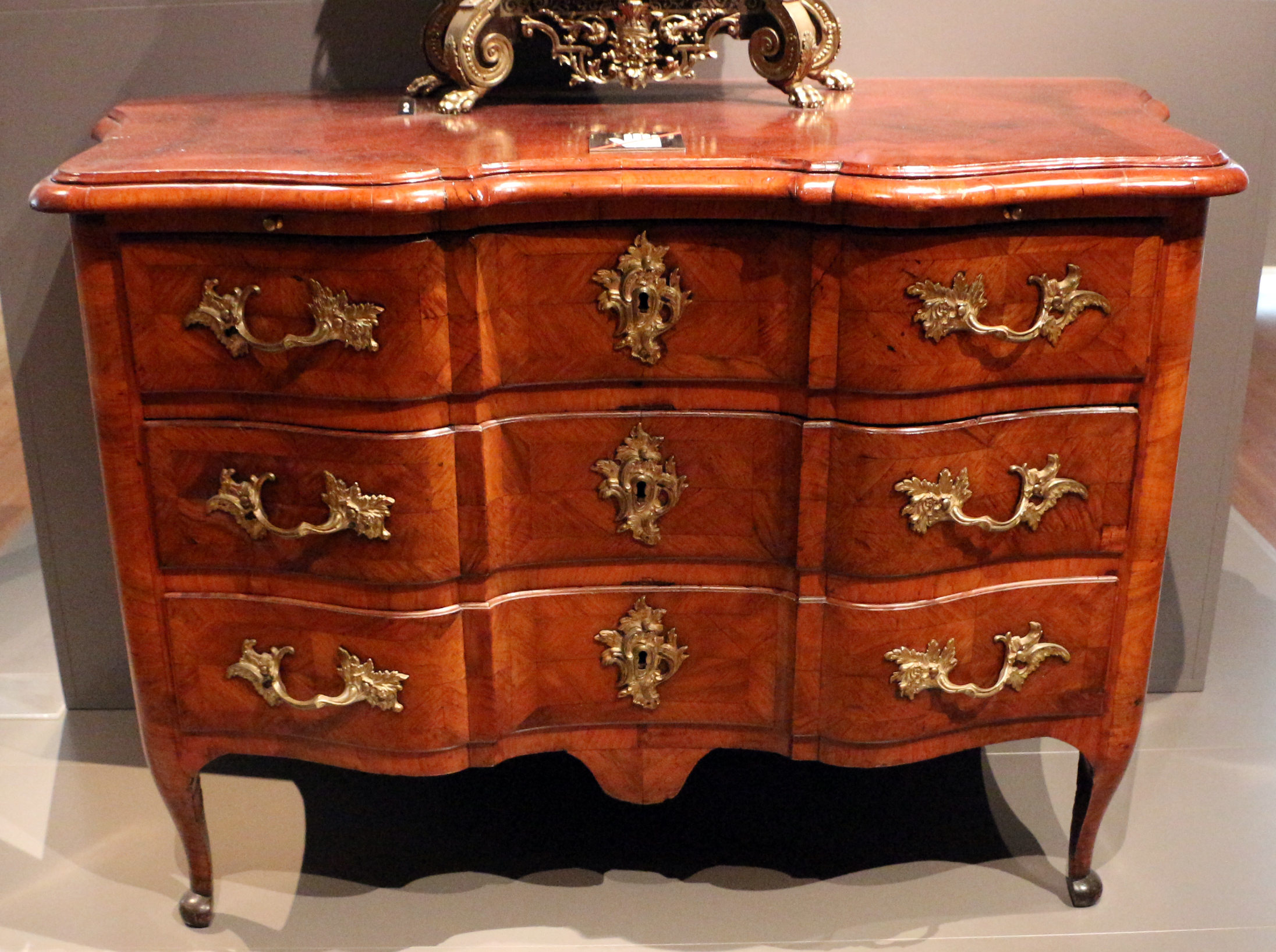
Commode designed by Haupt.

== References and sources ==
Sources

- Lagerquist, Marshall: "Haupt, Georg", Svenskt biografiskt lexikon, Vol. 18 (Stockholm 1969–1971), pp. 349–352
