= U53 =

U53 may refer to:

- German submarine U-53, various vessels
- Great icosahedron
- HMS Deptford (U53), a sloop of the Royal Navy
- Small nucleolar RNA SNORD53
- Uppland Runic Inscription 53
