= History of Stockholm =

History of the capital of Sweden

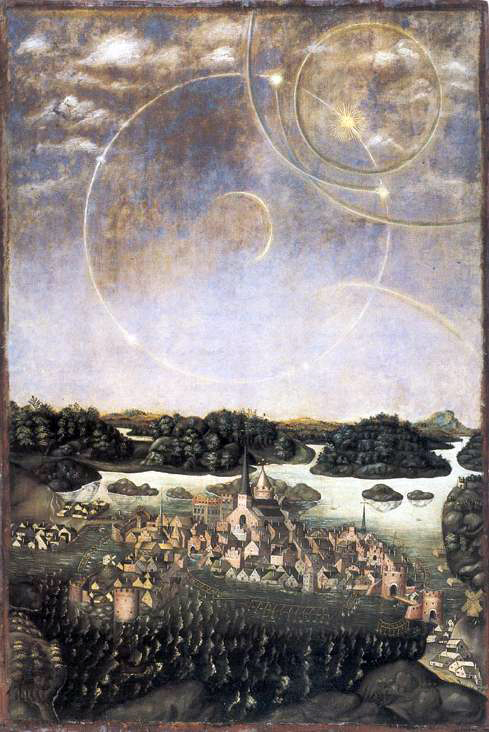
Vädersolstavlan ("The Sun dog Painting"), the oldest image depicting Stockholm. The original painting, painted by Urban målare in 1535, is lost, this copy from the 1630s, painted by Jacob Elbfas, hangs in Storkyrkan.

The history of Stockholm, capital of Sweden, for many centuries coincided with the development of what is today known as Gamla stan, the Stockholm Old Town.

== Origins ==
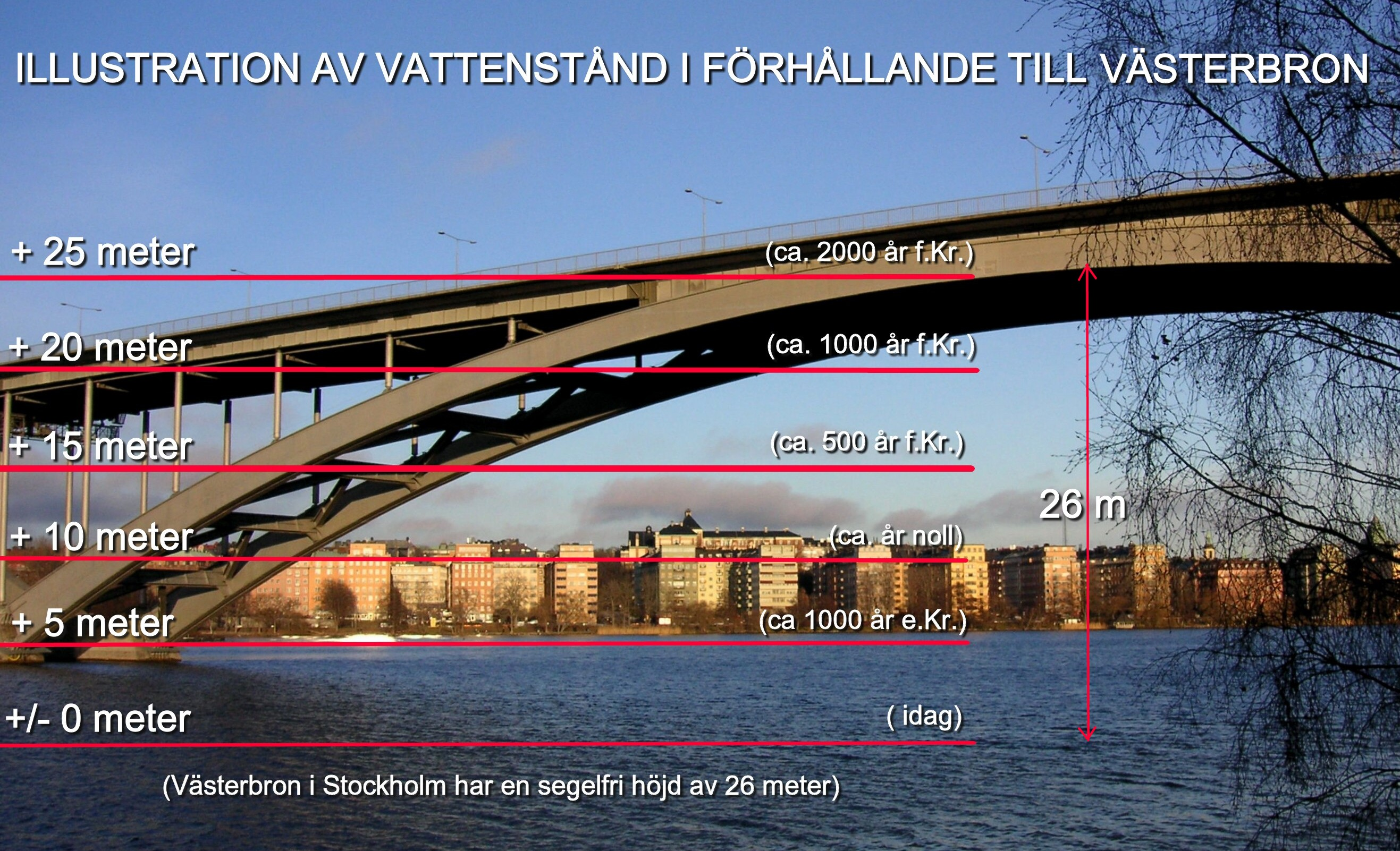
Illustration of historical waterlevels in the Stockholm region, using the Västerbron bridge.

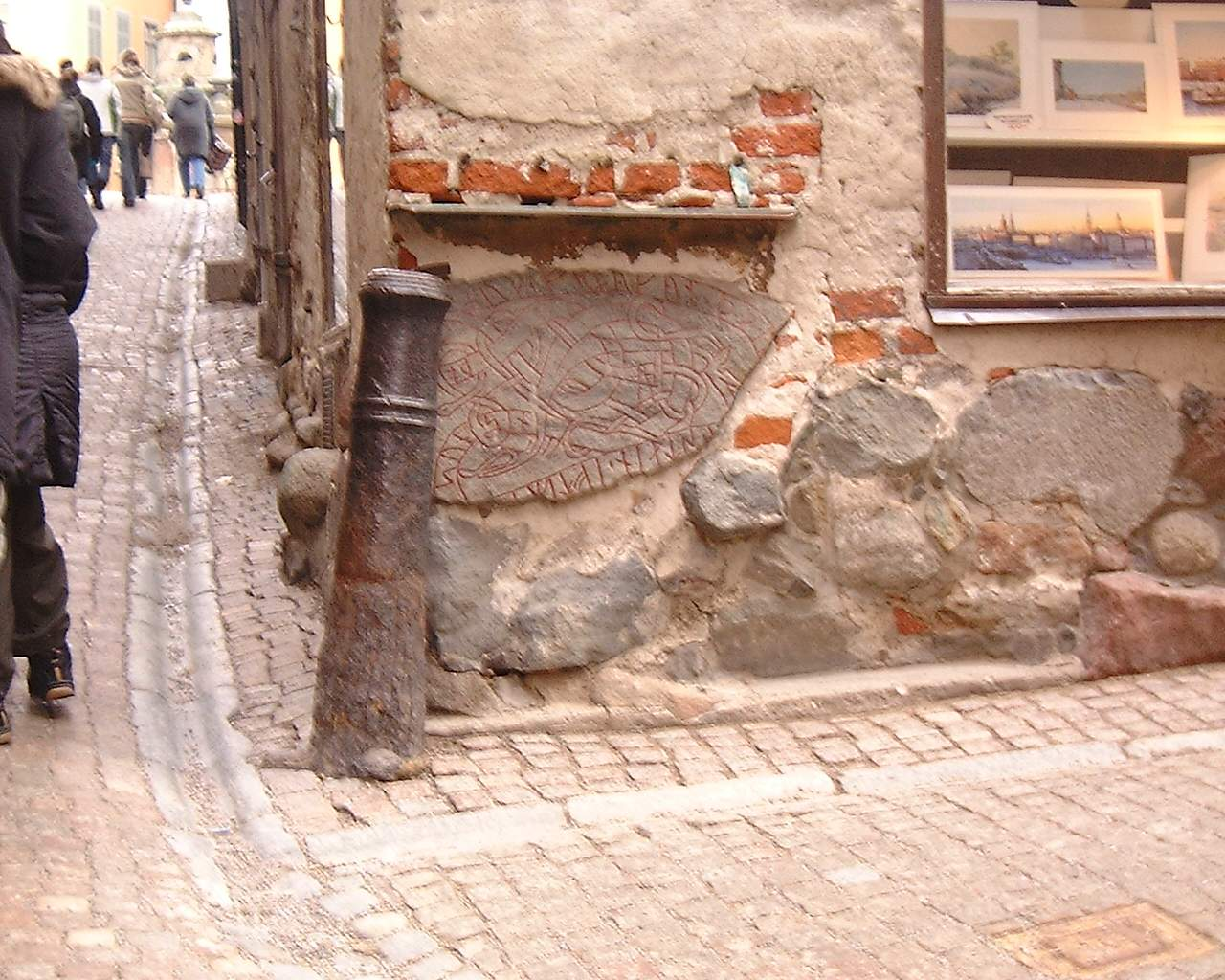
U 53, a fragment of a runestone built into a wall in the intersection of Prästgatan and Kåkbrinken, is believed to have been brought from an Iron Age settlement not far from today's old town.

The name 'Stockholm' easily splits into two distinct parts – Stock-holm, "Log-islet", but as no serious explanation to the name has been produced, various myths and legends have attempted to fill in the gap. According to a 17th-century myth the population at the viking settlement Birka decided to found a new settlement, and to determine its location had a log bound with gold drifting in Lake Mälaren. It landed on present day Riddarholmen where today the Tower of Birger Jarl stands, a building, as a consequence, still often erroneously mentioned as the oldest building in Stockholm. The most established explanation for the name are logs driven into the strait passing north of today's old town which dendrochronological examinations in the late 1970s dated to around 1000. While no solid proofs exists, it is often assumed the Three Crown Castle, which preceded the present Stockholm Palace, originated from these wooden structures, and that the medieval city quickly expanded around it in the mid 13th century. In a wider historical context, Stockholm can be thought of as the capital of the Lake Mälaren Region, and as such can trace its origin back to at least two much older cities: Birka (c. 790–975) and Sigtuna, which still exists but dominated the region c. 1000–1240 — a capital which has simply been relocated at a number of occasions.

== Middle Ages ==
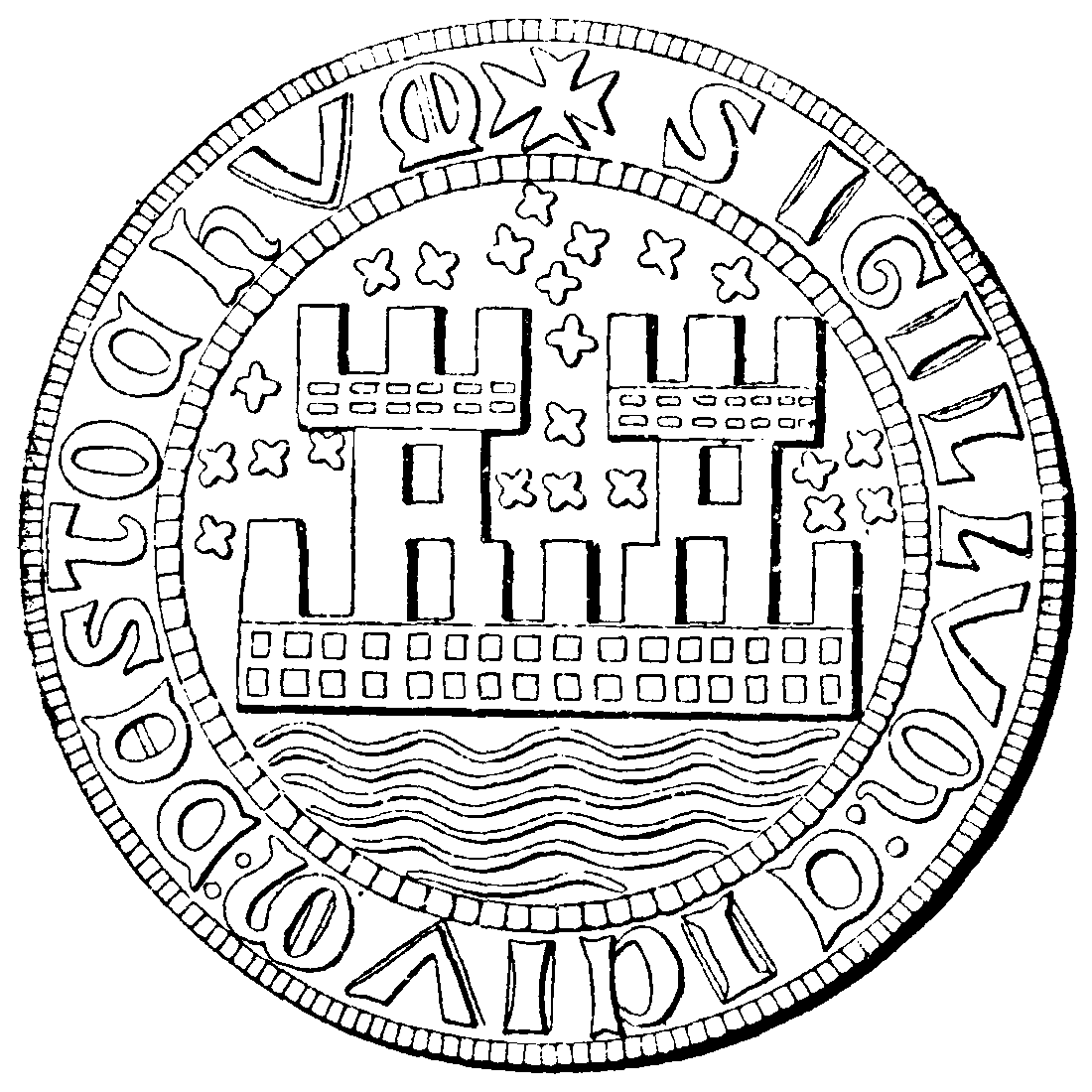
Seal of Stockholm known from an imprint from 1296; most likely the city's first seal mentioned in a letter from 1281.

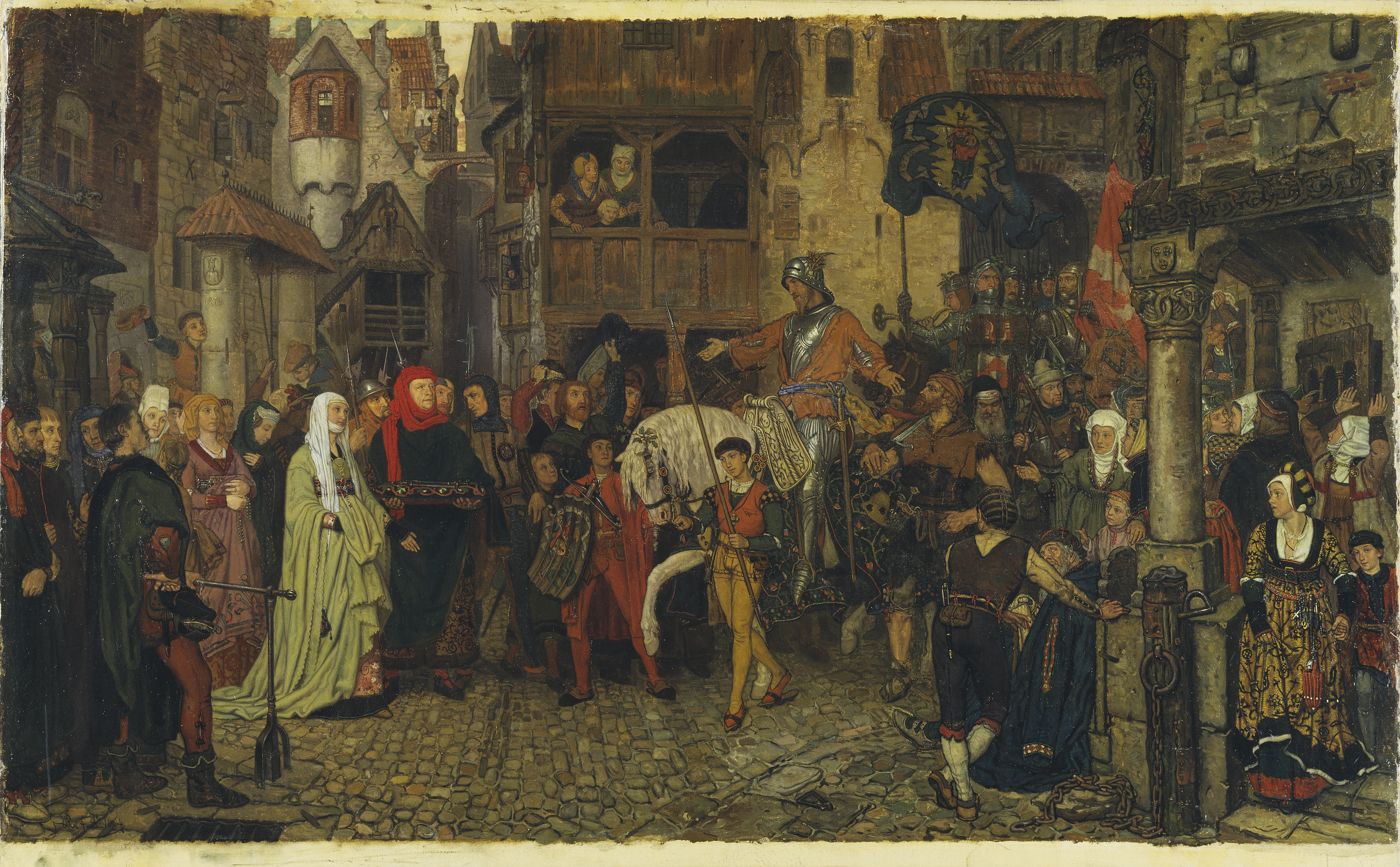
Sten Sture the Elder enters Stockholm in 1471 Painting by Georg von Rosen, 1864

The name Stockholm first appears in historical records in letters written by Birger Jarl and King Valdemar dated 1252. However, the two letters give no information about the appearance of the city and events during the following decades remain diffuse. While the absence of a perpendicular city plan in medieval Stockholm seems to indicate a spontaneous growth, it is known German merchants invited by Birger Jarl played an important role in the foundation of the city. Under any circumstance, during the end of the 13th century, Stockholm quickly grew to become not only the largest city in Sweden, but also the de facto Swedish political centre and royal residence. Thus, from its foundation, Stockholm has been the largest and most important Swedish city, inseparable from and dependent on the Swedish government. However, as late as the 16th century, reigns of Kings Eric XIV and John III, whose Swedish government often travelled with them elsewhere (see below), the city was still not what could be called a national capital in modern terms.

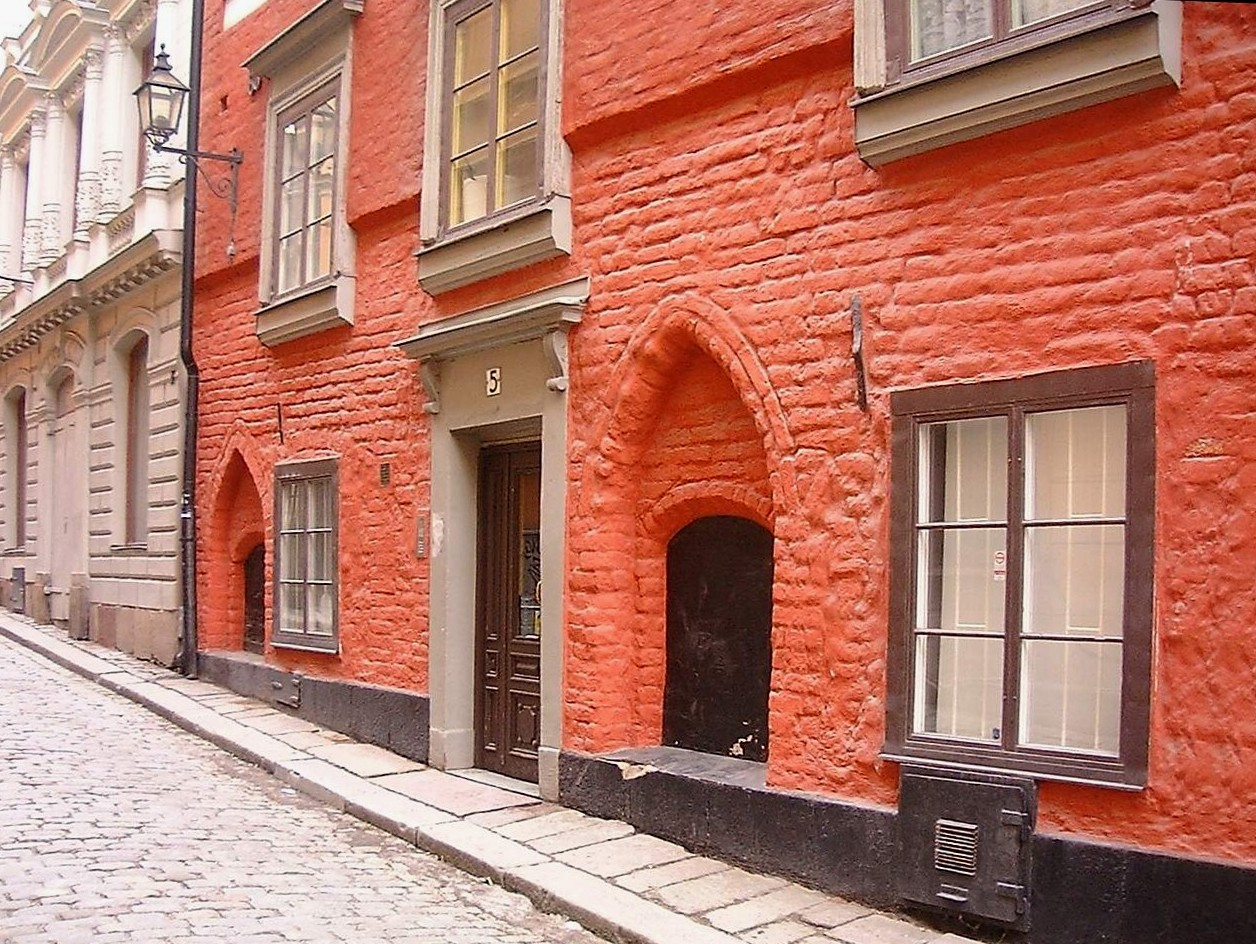
During the late Middle Ages, most buildings were made of brick, which gave the city its character. Some prominent façades were, however, painted red to accentuate their importance — like the restored façade of 5, Stora Gråmunkegränd, also featuring several other aesthetic details.

During the Kalmar Union (1397–1523), controlling Stockholm was crucial to anyone aspiring to control the kingdom, and the city was consequently repeatedly besieged by various Swedish-Danish factions. In 1452, a Danish fleet made a failed attack on the city. In 1471, Sten Sture the Elder defeated Christian I of Denmark at the Battle of Brunkeberg only to lose the city to Hans of Denmark in 1497. Sten Sture managed to seize power again in 1501 which resulted in a Danish blockade lasting 1502–1509 and eventually a short peace. Hans' son Christian II of Denmark finally conquered it in 1520 and had many leading nobles and burghers of Stockholm beheaded in the so-called Stockholm Bloodbath. When King Gustav Vasa finally besieged and conquered the city three years later, an event which ended the Kalmar Union and the Swedish Middle Ages, he noted every second building in the city was abandoned.

By the end of the 15th century, the population in Stockholm can be estimated to 5,000–7,000 people, which made it a relatively small town compared to several other contemporary European cities. On the other hand, it was far larger than any other city in Sweden. Many of its inhabitants were Germans and Finns, with the former forming a political and economic elite in the city.

During the Middle Ages, export was administered mostly by German merchants living by the squares Kornhamnstorg ("Grain Harbour Square") and Järntorget ("Iron Square") on the southern corner of the city. Regional peasantry supplied the city with food and raw materials, while the craftsmen in the city produced handicrafts, most of whom lived by the central square Stortorget or by the oldest two streets in Stockholm, the names of which still reflects their trade: Köpmangatan ("Merchant Street") and Skomakargatan ("Shoemaker Street") in the central part of the city. Other groups lived by the eastern or western thoroughfares, Västerlånggatan and Österlånggatan.

== Early Vasa era ==
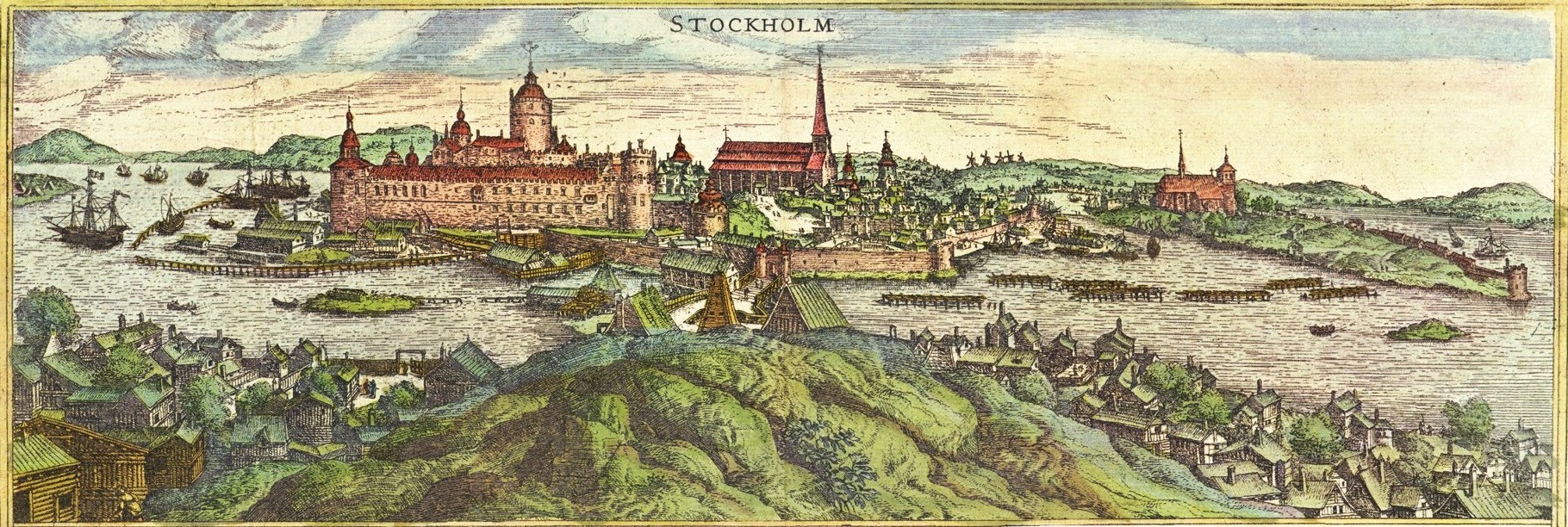
Panoramic view showing the northern city gate with fortifications. Copperplate by Frans Hogenberg around 1570–80.

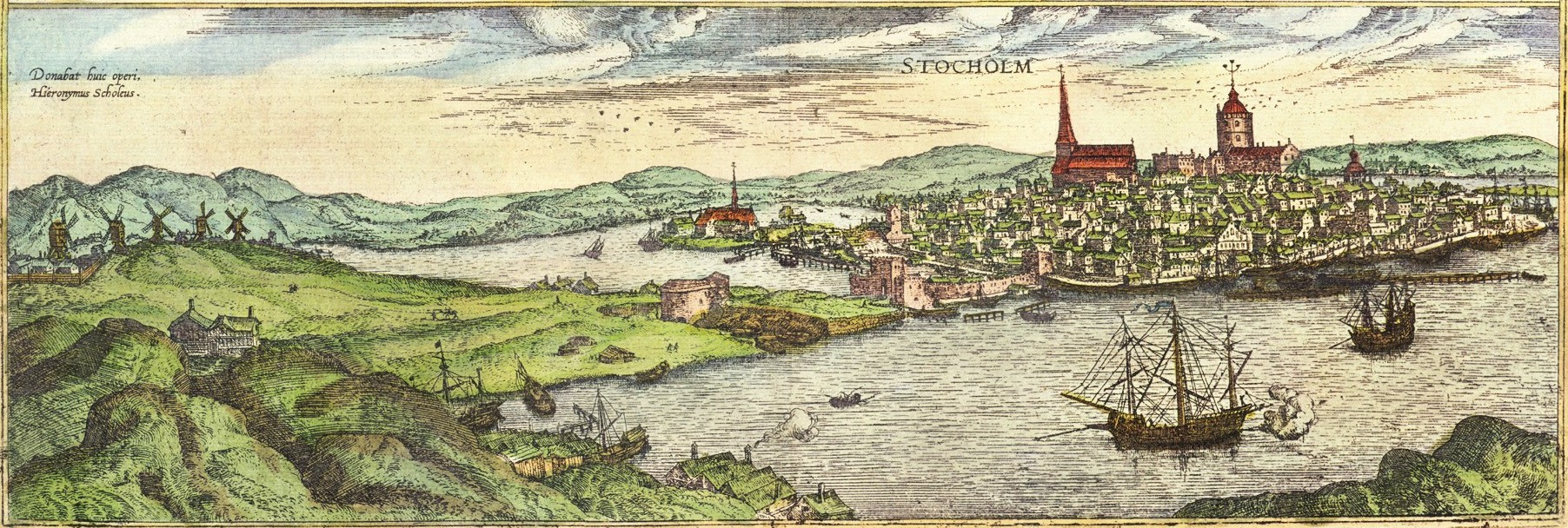
The southern city gate with parts of the eastern harbour called Koggabron ("Cog Harbour"). Copperplate by Frans Hogenberg.

After Gustav Vasa's siege of Stockholm, he restored the privileges of the city which was beneficiary to the burghers of the city. The king maintained his control over the city by controlling the elections of aldermen and magistrates. By the mid-century, the numbers of officials increased in order to make the management of the city more professional and to ensure the state-controlled trade. Stockholm thus lost much of the independence it had had during the Middle Ages and became politically and financially bound to the state. During the reign of his sons (1561–1611), the city council remained escorted by a royal representative and both magistrates and aldermen were appointed by the king.

Gustav Vasa invited the clergyman Olaus Petri (1493–1552) to become the city secretary of Stockholm. With the two side by side, the new ideas of the Protestant Reformation could be quickly implemented, and sermons in the church were held in Swedish starting in 1525 and Latin was abolished in 1530. A consequence of this development was a need for separate churches for the numerous German and Finnish-speaking citizens and during the 1530 the still-existent German and Finnish parishes were created. The king was, however, not favourably disposed to older chapels and churches in the city, and he ordered churches and monasteries on the ridges surrounding the city to be demolished, together with the numerous charitable institutions.

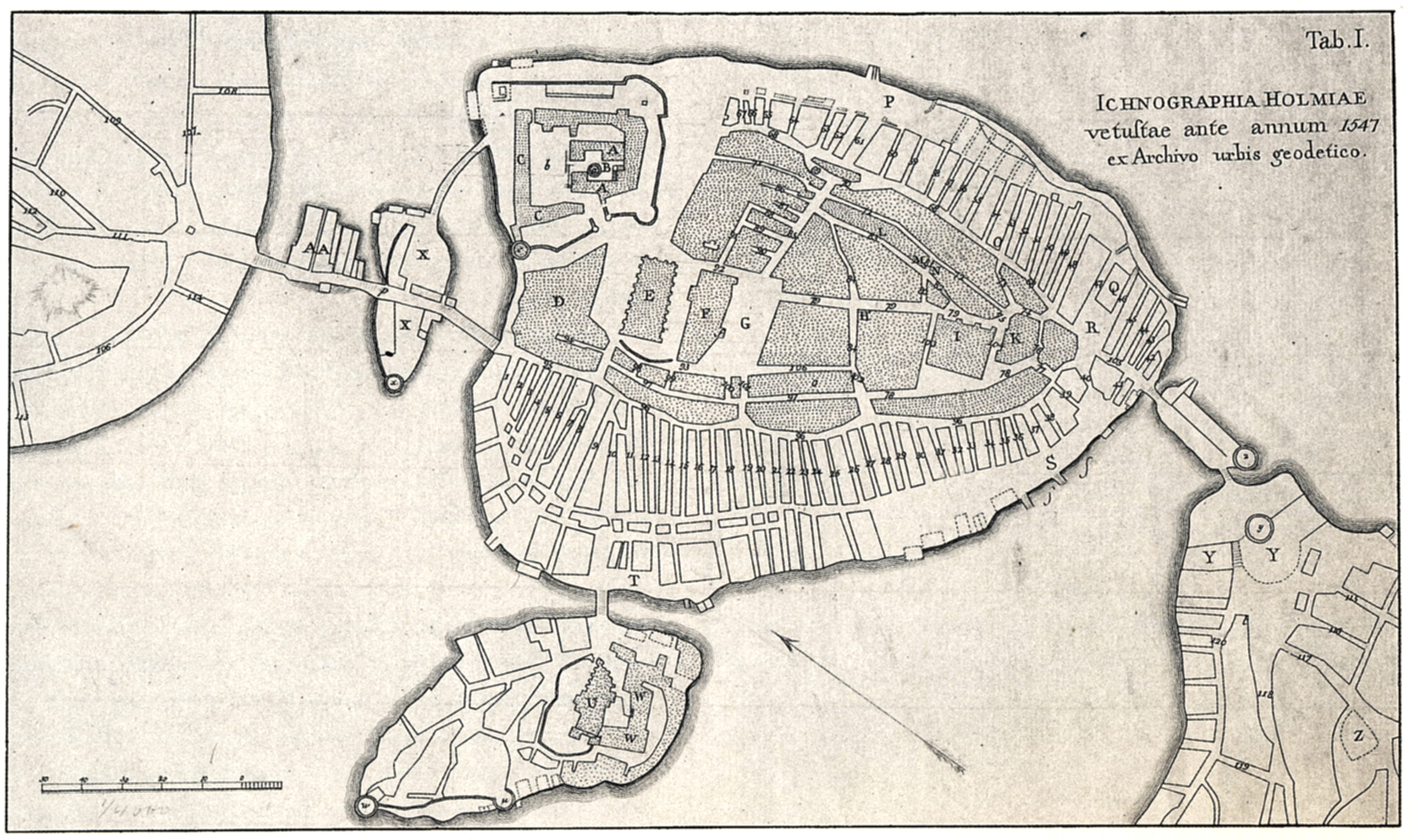
Map of Stockholm in 1547

Because Stockholm had a city wall, it was exempted from the tax paid by other Swedish cities. During the reign of Gustav Vasa the city's fortifications were reinforced and in the Stockholm Archipelago, Vaxholm was created to guard the inlet from the Baltic. While the medieval structure of Stockholm remained mostly unaltered during the 16th century, the city's social and economic importance grew to the extent that no king could permit the city to determine its own faith – the most important export item being bar iron and the most important destination Lübeck. During the reign of Vasa's sons, trade led many Swedes to settle in the city, but the trade and the capital needed to control it was largely in the hands of the king and German merchants from Lübeck and Danzig. Throughout the era, Sweden could hardly claim the level of government and bureaucracy requisite to a capital in the modern sense, but Stockholm was the kingdom's strongest bastion and the king's main residence. As Eric XIV's pretensions were on par with those of Renaissance princes on the continent, he afforded himself the largest court his finances could possibly support, and the royal castle was thus the biggest employer in the city.

Around 1560–80, most of the citizens, some 8,000 people, still lived on Stadsholmen. This central island was at this time densely settled and the city was now expanding on the ridges surrounding the city. Stockholm had no private palaces at this time and the only larger buildings were the castle, the church, and the former Franciscan friary on Riddarholmen. The surrounding ridges, unable to boast a single timber framed building, were mostly used for activities that either required a lot of space, produced odours, or could cause fire. Even though some burghers had secondary residences outside the city, the population living on the ridges, perhaps a quarter of the city's population, were mostly poor, including the royal personnel occupying the ridges north of the city.

== Great Power era ==
Stockholm presented as a capital worthy of a powerful nation. Engraving from Suecia Antiqua et Hodierna around 1690.

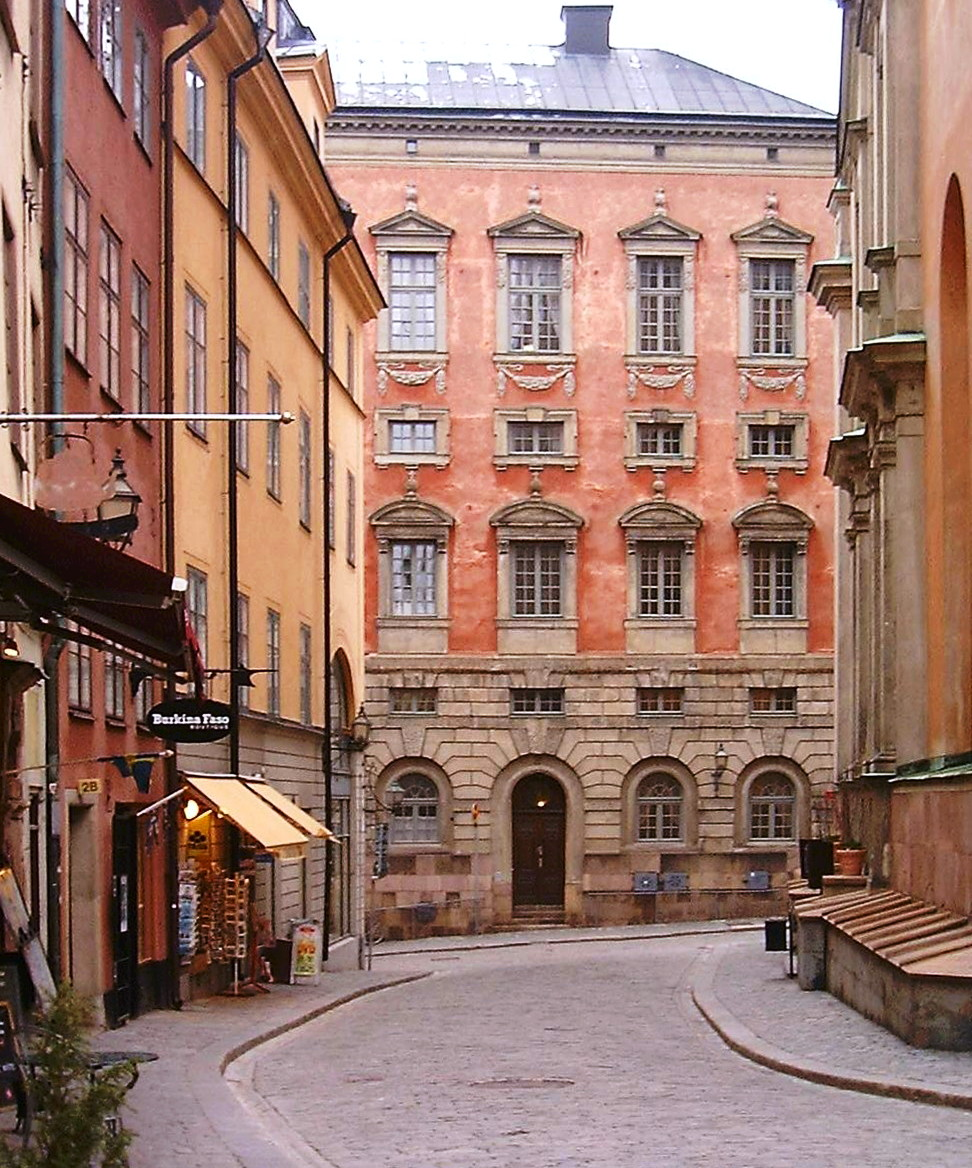
One of the finest surviving examples of the ambitions of the era is undoubtedly Axel Oxenstierna's own palace built from 1653 to the design of Jean de la Vallée (1620–1696).

Following the Thirty Years' War (1618–1648), Sweden was determined never to repeat the embarrassment experienced following the death of Gustavus II Adolphus (1594–1632) when Stockholm, still medieval in character, caused hesitation on whether to invite foreign statesmen for fear the lamentable appearance might undermine the nation's authority. Therefore, Stockholm saw many ambitious city plans during the era, of which those for the ridges surrounding today's old town still stands. In accordance to the mercantilism of the era, trade and industry was concentrated to cities where it was easier to control, and Stockholm was of central importance. In a letter in 1636, Chancellor Axel Oxenstierna (1583–1654) wrote that evolving the Swedish capital was a prerequisite for the nation's power and strength and that this would bring all the other cities on their feet. Increased state intervention on city level was not unique to Sweden at this time, but it was probably more prominent in the case of Stockholm than anywhere else in Europe. To this end, the government of the city was reformed and the former volunteered magistrates gradually replaced by professionals with a theoretical education.

=== Population and city plans ===
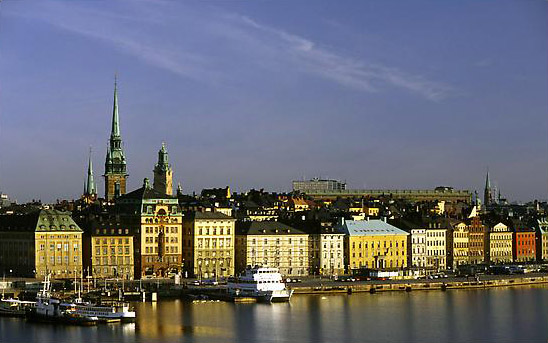
Skeppsbron.

The process of reshaping Stockholm was initiated by a major fire in 1625 which destroyed the south-western part of today's old town. As a result, two new boulevard-like streets were created — Stora Nygatan and Lilla Nygatan — and along the eastern waterfront the medieval wall was replaced by a row of prestigious palaces — Skeppsbron.

For the ridges surrounding the city – Norrmalm, Östermalm, Kungsholmen, and Södermalm – new city plans were worked out to create wide and straight artery streets. The project was implemented so thoroughly, in several parts of the city no traces exist of the previous medieval structures. Many of the streets from this era are still extant, and some of those proposed have been realised with some minor modifications.

The population grew from less than 10,000 in the early 17th century to more than 50,000 in the mid-1670s.

The city's income rose from 18,595 daler in 1635–36 to 81,480 daler in 1644. In 1642, approximately 60 per cent of that sum was spent on construction works.

=== Law enforcement and the poor ===
The growing city of Stockholm also had a greater demand for law enforcement. In 1624, the first prison in the city, called "Tukthuset," was established. During their time in prison, the inmates were tasked with creating textiles. To reduce the crime rate and maintain order, a mounted nighttime police force was created to prevent crimes and escort people to their homes.

In 1633, the "Great Orphanage" (the exact name was "Stora barnhuset") was established in Norrmalm. The children would work and be taught a profession while having a place to sleep and eat.

Beggars were prohibited in Stockholm in 1642, including those who were legally allowed to beg. This marked a significant change from medieval times when poverty was often regarded as having religious worth; now, beggars were seen as lazy. The "right poor"—for example, those who had been injured and were therefore unable to work—would be housed in care houses called "fattighus," while the "wrong poor" would be placed in workhouses. Despite this, a large number of mutilated soldiers and other impoverished individuals moved to the city in hopes of a better future.

=== Trade ===
Map of Stockholm (1713)

Other Swedish cities were deprived of their export privileges by the so-called "Bothnian Trade Coercion" (Bottniska handelstvånget). Most Swedish cities were granted a trade monopoly over a limited surrounding area, but for Stockholm most of the lands surrounding the Gulf of Bothnia formed part of the city's trade territory. However, the state-granted monopoly was not the only thing that favoured Stockholm at that time. It was one of the best natural harbours of the era and throughout the 17th century, countless foreign visitors marvelled at the sight of large ships "with 60 or 70 cannons" moored along the eastern quay next to the royal castle.

In contrast with other Swedish cities, all of which were self-supporting, Stockholm was completely dependent of the transit passing through the city—it had, for example, about the same number of domestic animals as Uppsala, which only had ten per cent the population of the capital. All goods brought into Stockholm had to pass through one of six customs stations, and approximately three-fourths of them were exported from the city. Half of the remaining items, mostly fishery products, were delivered from the Baltic, and corn came from the Lake Mälaren region. However, during the latter half of the century, the rapidly growing capital could not be supported by the Lake Mälaren region alone and therefore became dependent on corn imported from the provinces.

Sweden had played a passive role in international trade during the 16th century; German merchants and ships managed the export of Swedish primary products such as osmond iron, raw copper, and butter. This export was largely regarded as a means of securing the import of items not available in Sweden, such as salt, wine, and luxury goods demanded at the court. With the introduction of a mercantile doctrine around 1620, trade became a keystone to governmental income and the Swedish economy subsequently focused on export, not of raw materials, but of refined products. Over the entire period (c. 1590–1685), Stockholm's share of the national economy remained stable at around two-thirds, but during the first half of the 17th century, export grew fourfold and import fivefold. Most goods were delivered to the Netherlands in the mid-17th century and to the UK in the early 18th century.

In the 17th century, the textile industry was developed with the establishments of the textile manufactures Paulinska manufakturerna (active 1673–1776) and the Barnängens manufaktur (active 1691–1826), which became two of the greatest sources of employments in the Swedish capital during the entire 18th-century.

== Age of Liberty (1718–1772) ==
Population
Late 17th century		55–66.000
Around 1720		45.000
Mid 18th century		60.000
Mid 19th century		90.000
Social stratification 1769–1850 (per cent)
Class	1769	1850
Upper	13	7
Middle	40	12
Lower	47	81

Following the Greater Wrath and the Treaty of Nystad in 1722, Sweden's role as a major European power was over, and the decades that followed brought even more disasters. Black death and the sufferings caused by the Great Northern Wars made Stockholm the capital of a shrinking nation, despair which would deepen even further when Sweden lost Finland in 1809. Notwithstanding Sweden's partial recover of spirit with the union with Norway in 1814, during the period 1750–1850, Stockholm was a stagnating city, with a dwindling population and widespread unemployment, marked by ill-health, poverty, alcoholism, and rampant mortality. The Mälaren region lost in influence to the benefit of south-western Sweden, and as population and welfare dwindled in the capital, there was a leveling of social classes. Wars and alcohol abuse resulted in a surplus of women during the period, with widows outnumbering widowers six to one in 1850. Stockholm was marked by an absence of children, caused by the number of unmarried people and high infant mortality. Average length of life was limited to 44, but those who survived infancy were likely to get about as old as people do today, except those born to a life of hard labour.

A stratification into three social groups can be made for this era :

1. individuals of rank and officers
2. craftsmen, small-scale entrepreneurs, and officials
3. journeymen, assistants, workers, soldiers, servants, paupers, and prisoners.

Women were associated with their husband's status. However, as craftsmen saw their status sink with the introduction of industrialism, the proletarian class grew during the period. There also was an economic segregation in the city, with the present old town and the lower parts of Norrmalm being the wealthiest (more than 150% above average); the suburbs (today part of central Stockholm) were poor (50% below average).

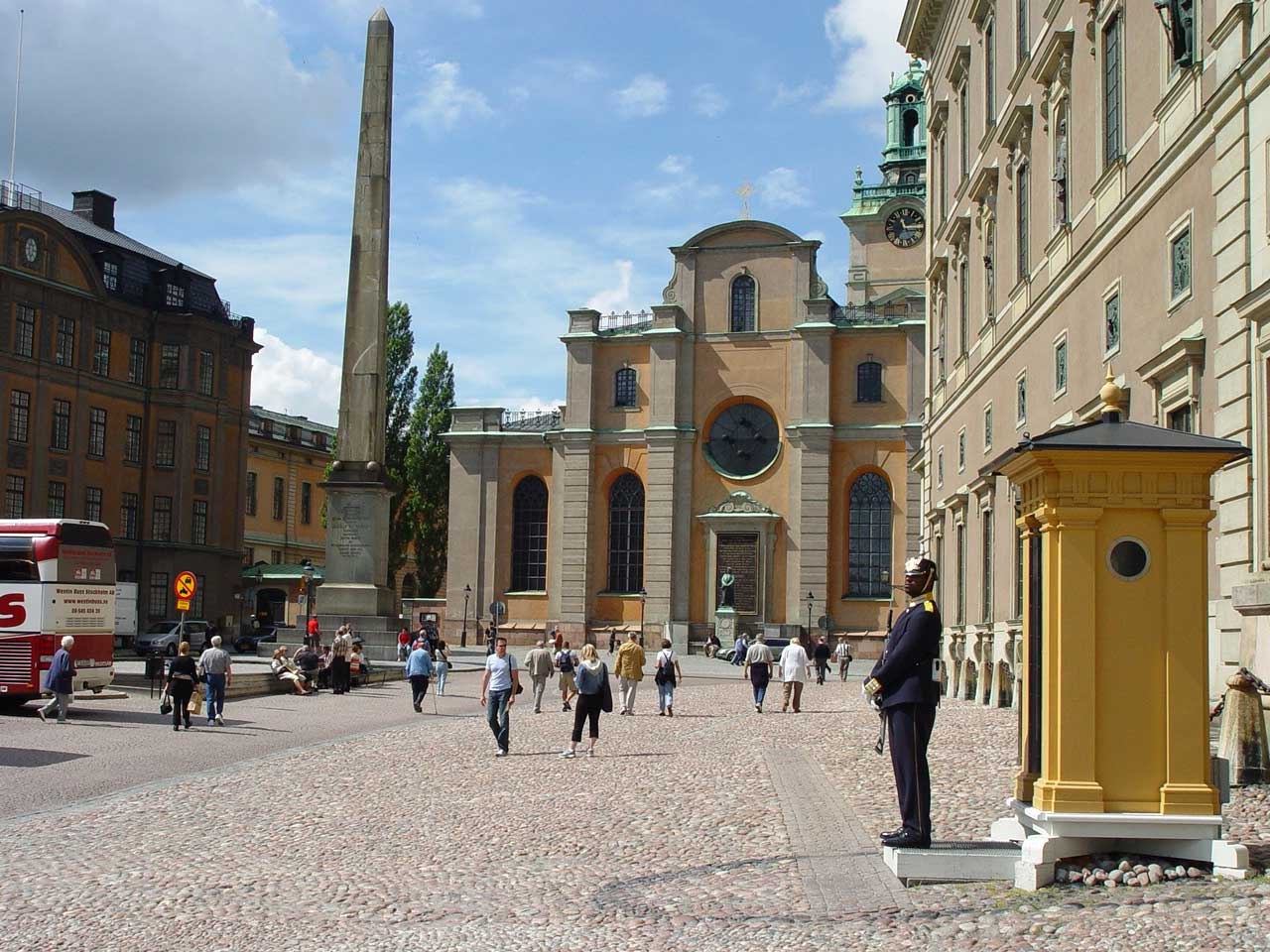
The medieval Storkyrkan was given its present Baroque exterior in 1636–72, in order to match the new royal palace

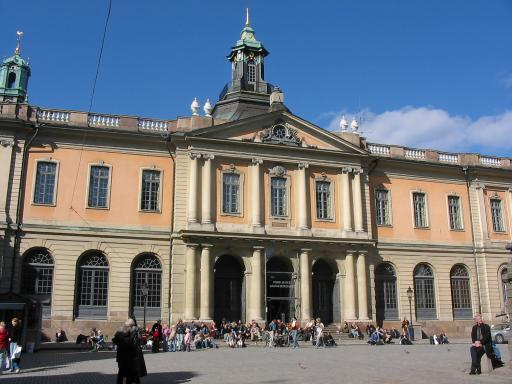
The Stock Exchange Building, on its completion in the 1770s the main representative building in the city, replaced the medieval town hall.

During the 18th century, the Mercantile model introduced the previous century was further developed, with domestic production promoted by loans and bounties and import limited to raw materials not available in Sweden by tolls. The era saw the rise of the so-called "Skeppsbro Nobility" (Skeppsbroadeln), the wealthy wholesalers at Skeppsbron who made a fortune by delivering bar iron to the international market and by controlling the chartered companies. The most successful of them was the Swedish East India Company (1731–1813) which had its headquarters in Gothenburg, but was of significant importance to Stockholm because of the shipbuilding yards, the trade houses, and the exotic products imported by the company. Furthermore, before these ships left Stockholm some 100–150 men per ship were recruited, most of them in the city, and as a single trip to China would take 1–2 years the company had a huge impact on Stockholm during this era.

During the 18th century, several devastating fires destroyed entire neighbourhoods which resulted in building codes being introduced. They improved fire safety by prohibiting wooden buildings and further embellished the city by implementing the 17th-century city plans. In the old town, the new royal palace was gradually completed and the exterior of the Storkyrkan church was adopted to it. The skilled artists and craftsmen working for the royal court formed an elite which considerably raised the artistic standards in the capital.

== Gustavian era (1772–1809) ==
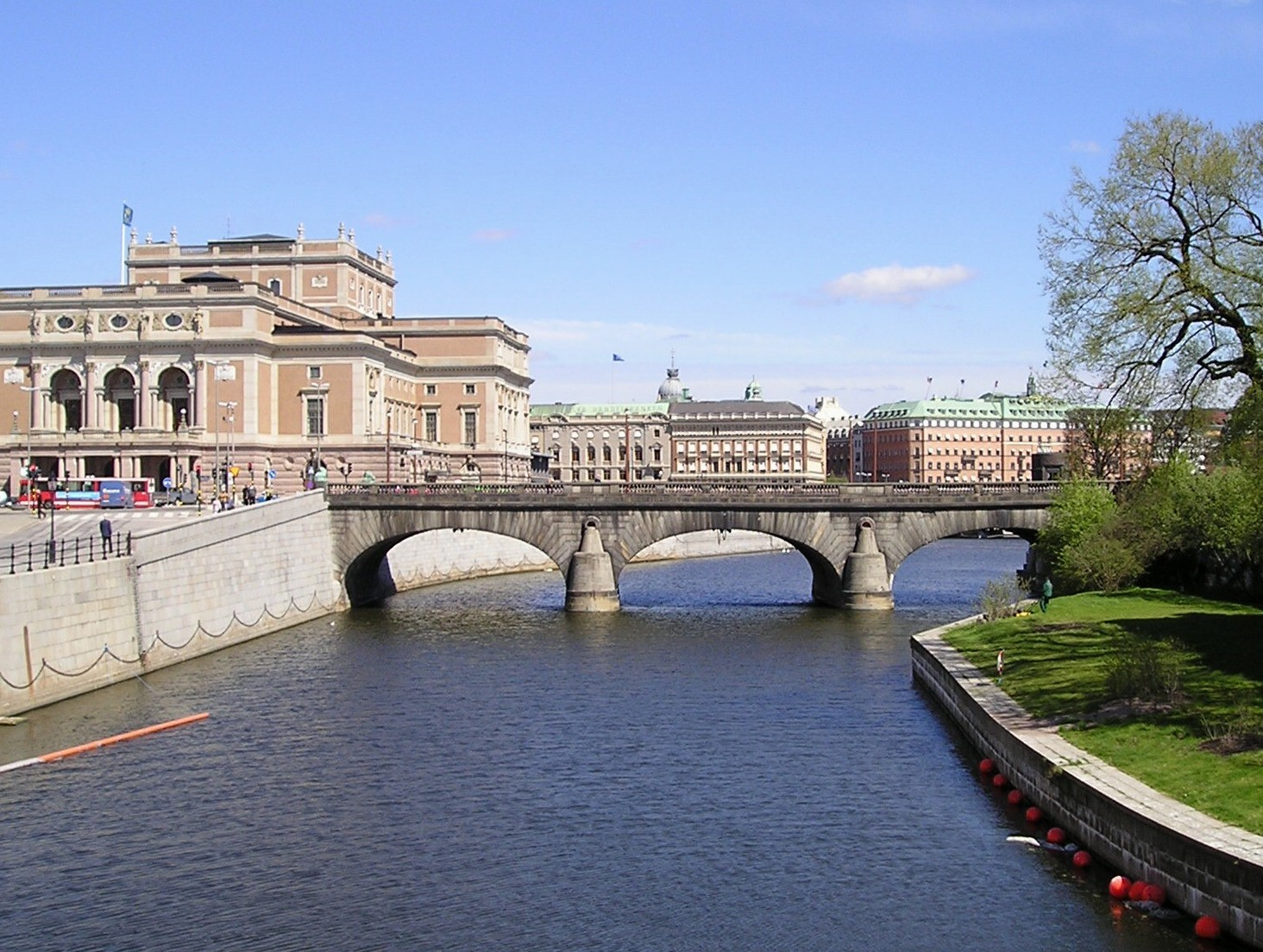
The Norrbro bridge was one of the most ambitious projects of the era.

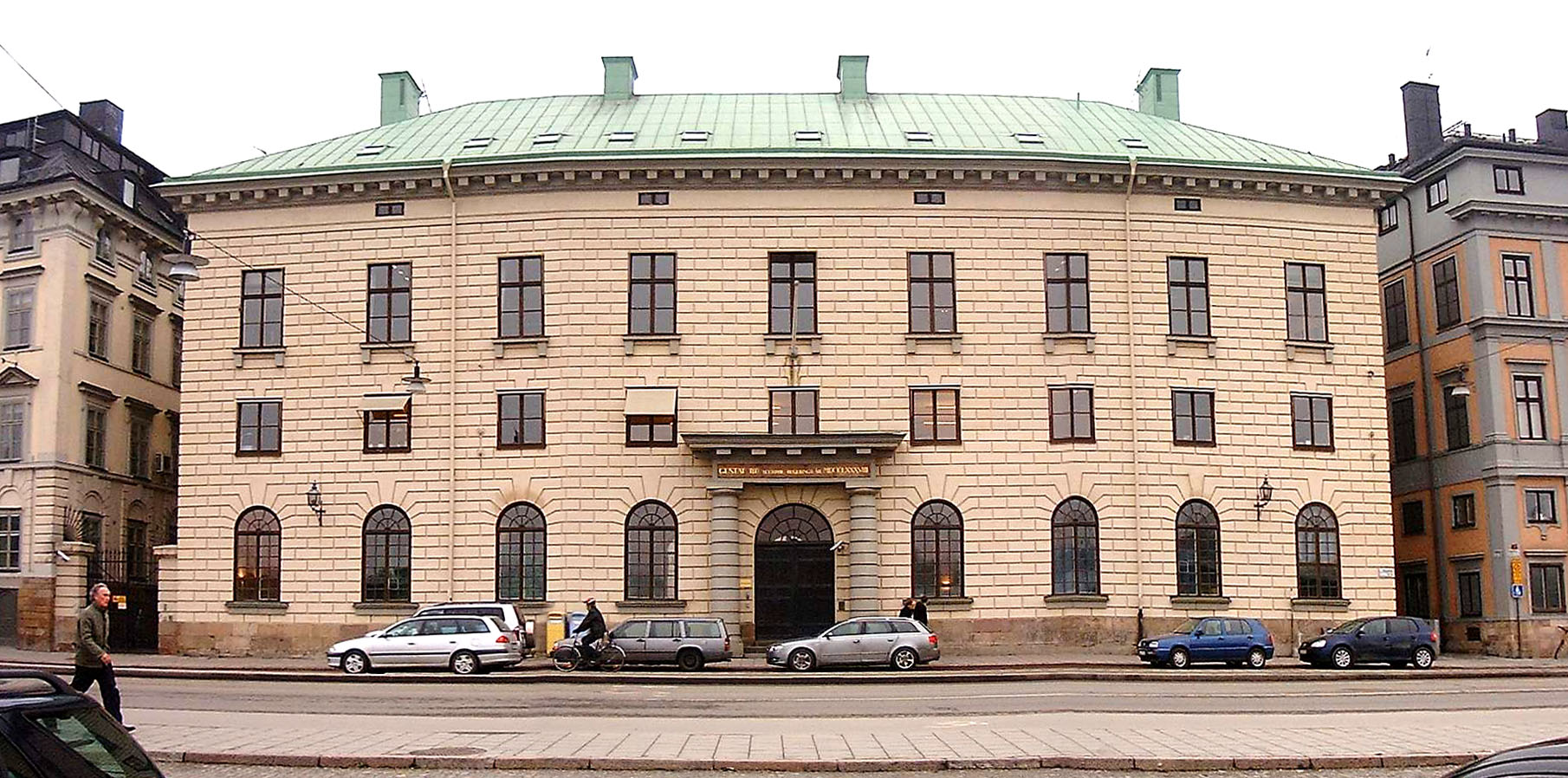
The customs house at Skeppsbron designed by Palmstedt 1783–90 is one of the finest surviving examples of the Gustavian classicism.

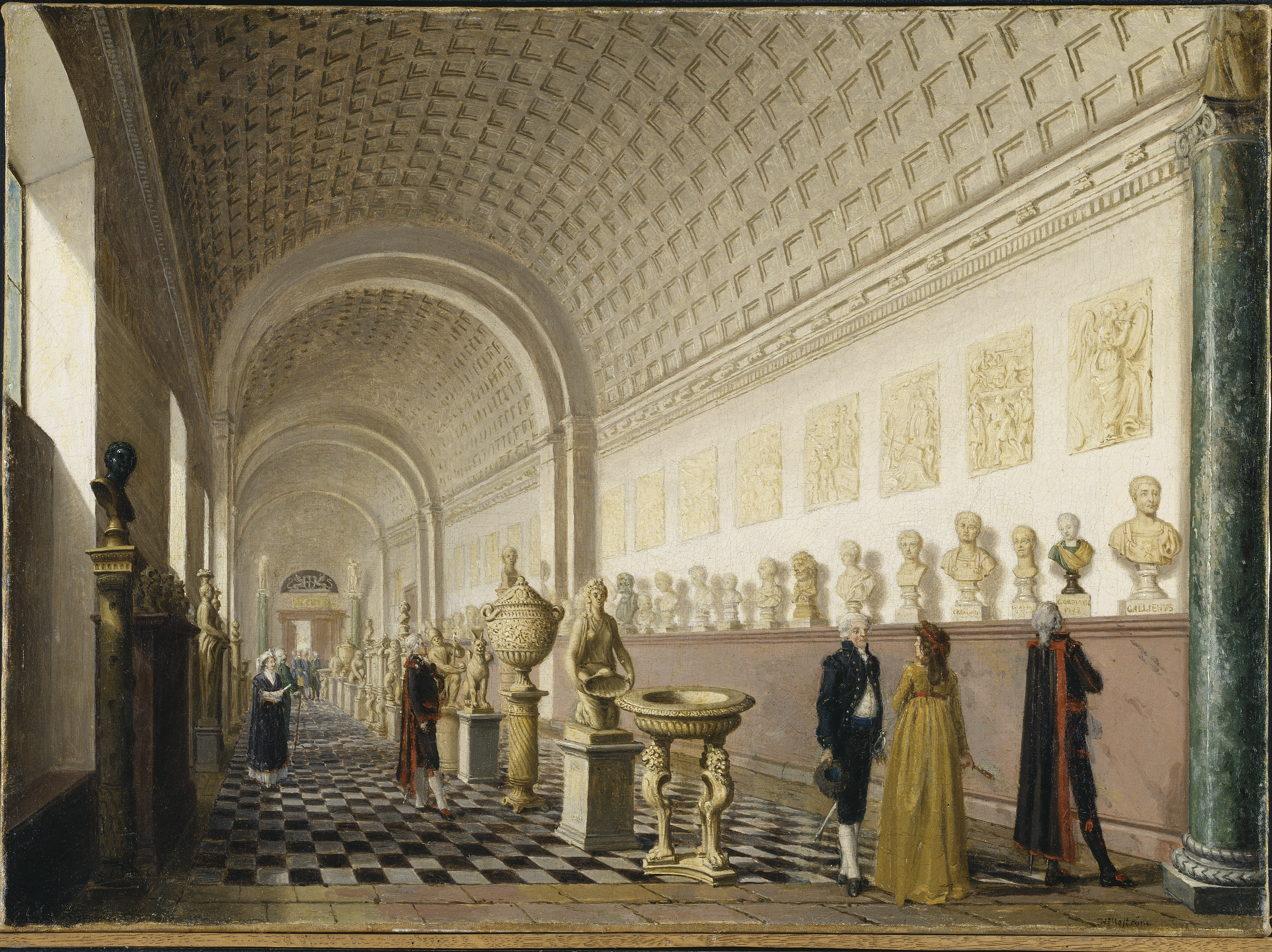
Interior from the museum of Gustav III, c. 1796.

During the enlightened absolute monarchy of Gustav III Stockholm managed to maintain its role as the political centre of Sweden and developed culturally.

The king had a great interest for the city's development. He created the Gustav Adolf square and had the Royal Opera inaugurated there in 1782 — in accordance to the original intentions of Tessin the Younger for a monumental square north of the palace. The façade of Arvfurstens palats on the opposite side is identical to the now replaced façade of the opera.

The neoclassical bridge Norrbro, designed by Erik Palmstedt (1741–1807) and was completed in ten years. It was a very ambitious project that caused the centre of the city to gradually move out of the medieval city.

The colourful and often burlesque descriptions of Stockholm by troubadour and composer Carl Michael Bellman are still popular.

The period ended as King Gustav IV Adolf was deposed in 1809 in a coup d'état. The loss of Finland that same year meant Stockholm ceased to be the geographical centre of the Swedish kingdom. As a result, the fortress "Karlsborg" was built between 1819 and 1909 to serve as a backup capital in wartime.

== Early industrial era (1809–1850) ==
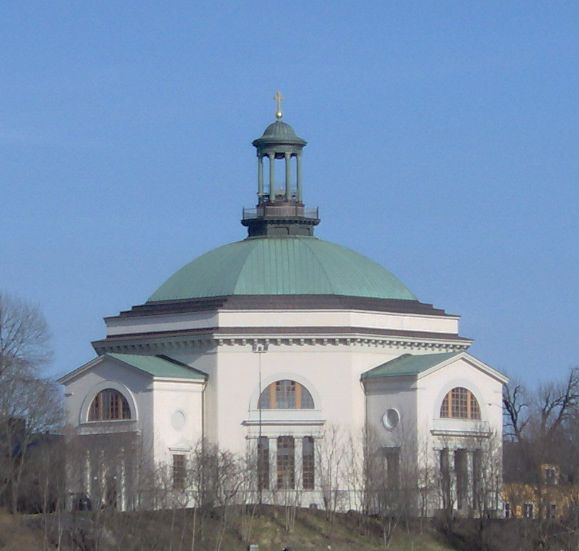
The Skeppsholmen Church by Fredrik Blom

For Stockholm, the early 19th century meant the only larger-scale projects to be realised were those initiated by the military which favoured a more stiff classicism, the local Swedish version of the Empire style (in Sweden named Karl Johansstil after King Charles XIV John). The architects dominating the era, Fredrik Blom and Carl Christoffer Gjörwell, both were commissioned by the military. Due to the general stagnation, few other constructions were realised — in average ten smaller residential buildings per year — additions which the ambitious city plans of the 17th century could easily handle.

During the later half of the 18th century real income dwindled to reach an all-time low in 1810 when it corresponded to roughly half that of the 1730s; public officials being those worst affected. Norrköping became the greatest manufacturing city of Sweden and Gothenburg developed into the key trading port because of its location on the North Sea.

Most people still lived within the present Old Town, with a growth along the eastern shore. Population also grew on the surrounding ridges, more so in the wealthy district Norrmalm and less so in the poor district Södermalm. However, many of the ridges surrounding the city were slums mostly rural in character without water and sewage and frequently ravaged by cholera.

== Late industrial era (1850–1910) ==
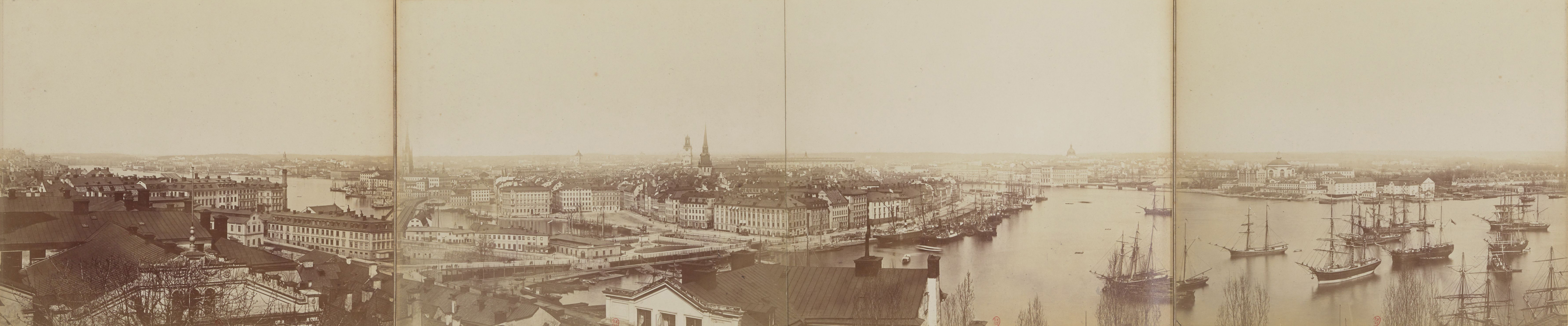
1881 panoramic view of Stockholm

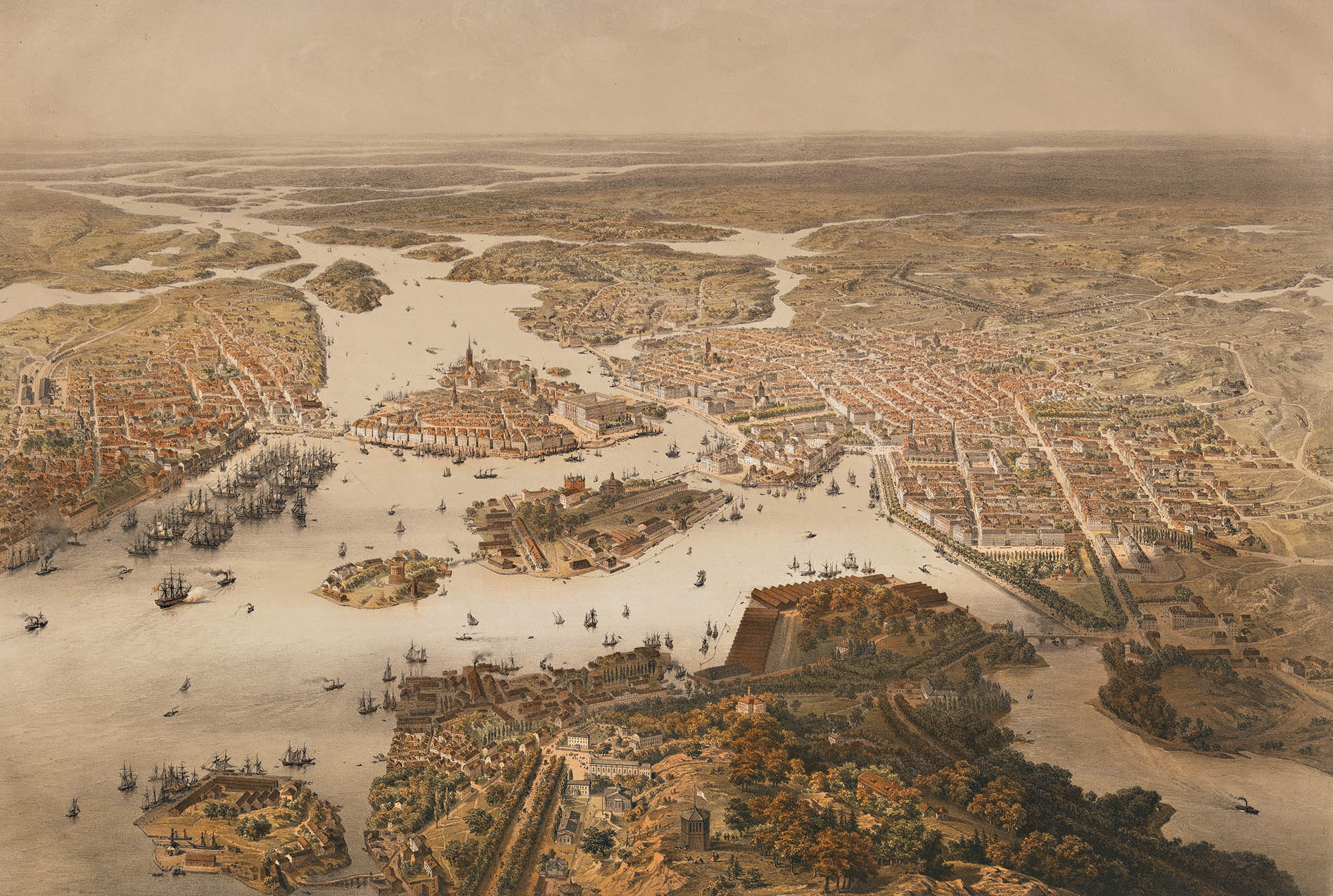
Panorama over Stockholm around 1868 as seen from a hot air balloon.

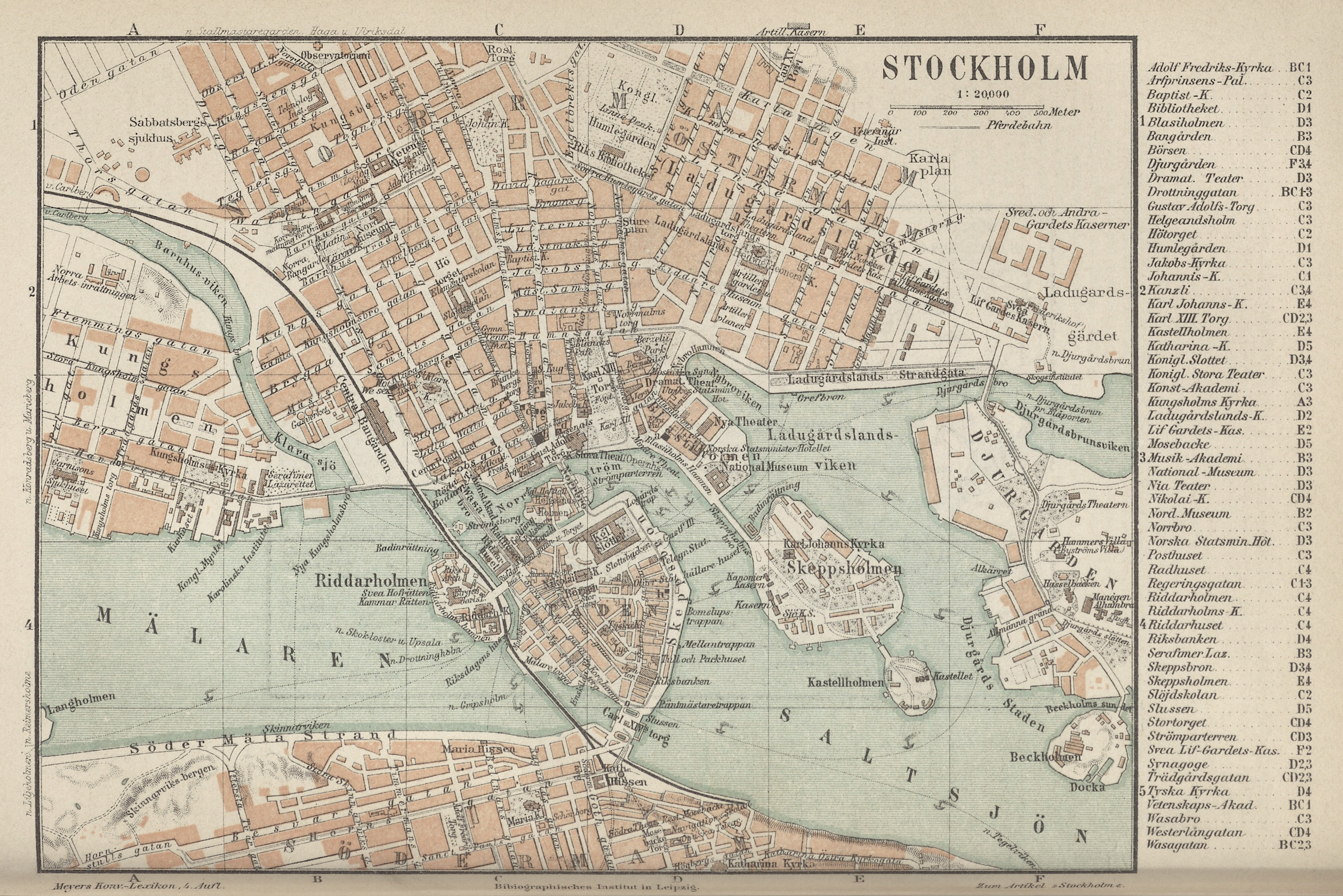
1890 German map of Stockholm

In the second half of the century, Stockholm regained its leading economic role. New industries emerged, and Stockholm transformed into an important trade and service centre, as well as a key gateway point within Sweden.

While steam engines were introduced in Stockholm in 1806 with the Eldkvarn mill, it took until the mid-19th century for industrialization to take off. Two factories, Ludvigsberg and Bolinder, constructed in the 1840s were followed by many others, and the economic development that succeeded resulted in some 800 new buildings being constructed 1850–70 — many of which were located in the Klara district and subsequently demolished in the Redevelopment of Norrmalm 1950–70.

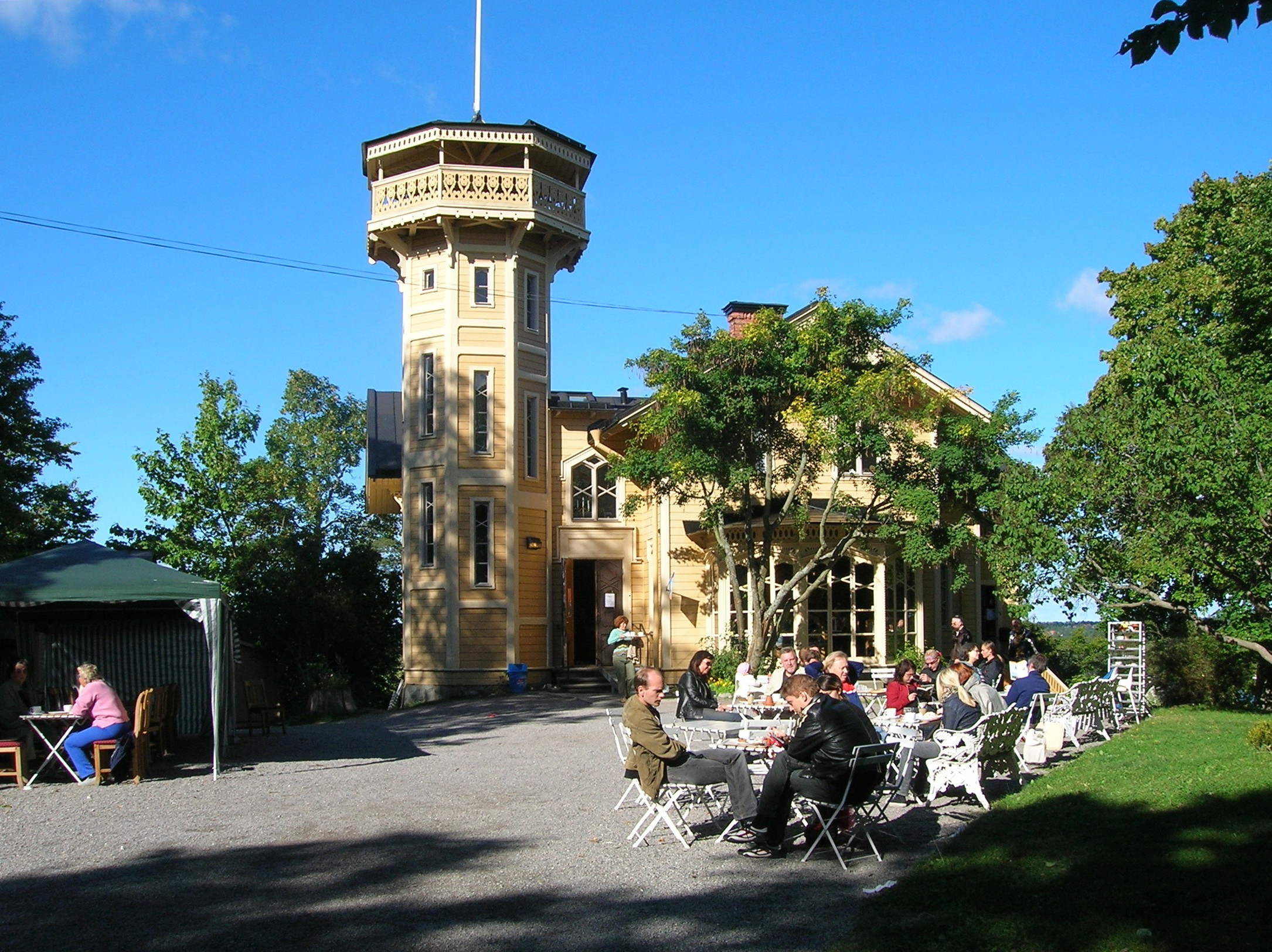
Lyran in Bredäng built in 1867 is one of the many surviving summer residences built around central Stockholm during the steam engine era.

During the 1850s and 1860s, gas works, sewage, and running water was introduced. Many streets were paved, including Skeppsbron and Strandvägen, and the railway brought Stockholm closer to continental Europe — an event which additionally lead to the creation of the first suburb Liljeholmen where railway workshops were located. As the railway was extended further north, Stockholm Central Station was inaugurated in 1871. The first horse-pulled trams were introduced in 1877. Long before the railway, steam engines became common on boats which resulted in many summertime residences being built around Stockholm. But the booming urban development was also notable in central Stockholm where several prominent Neo-Renaissance buildings were built, including the Academy of Music and Södra Teatern.

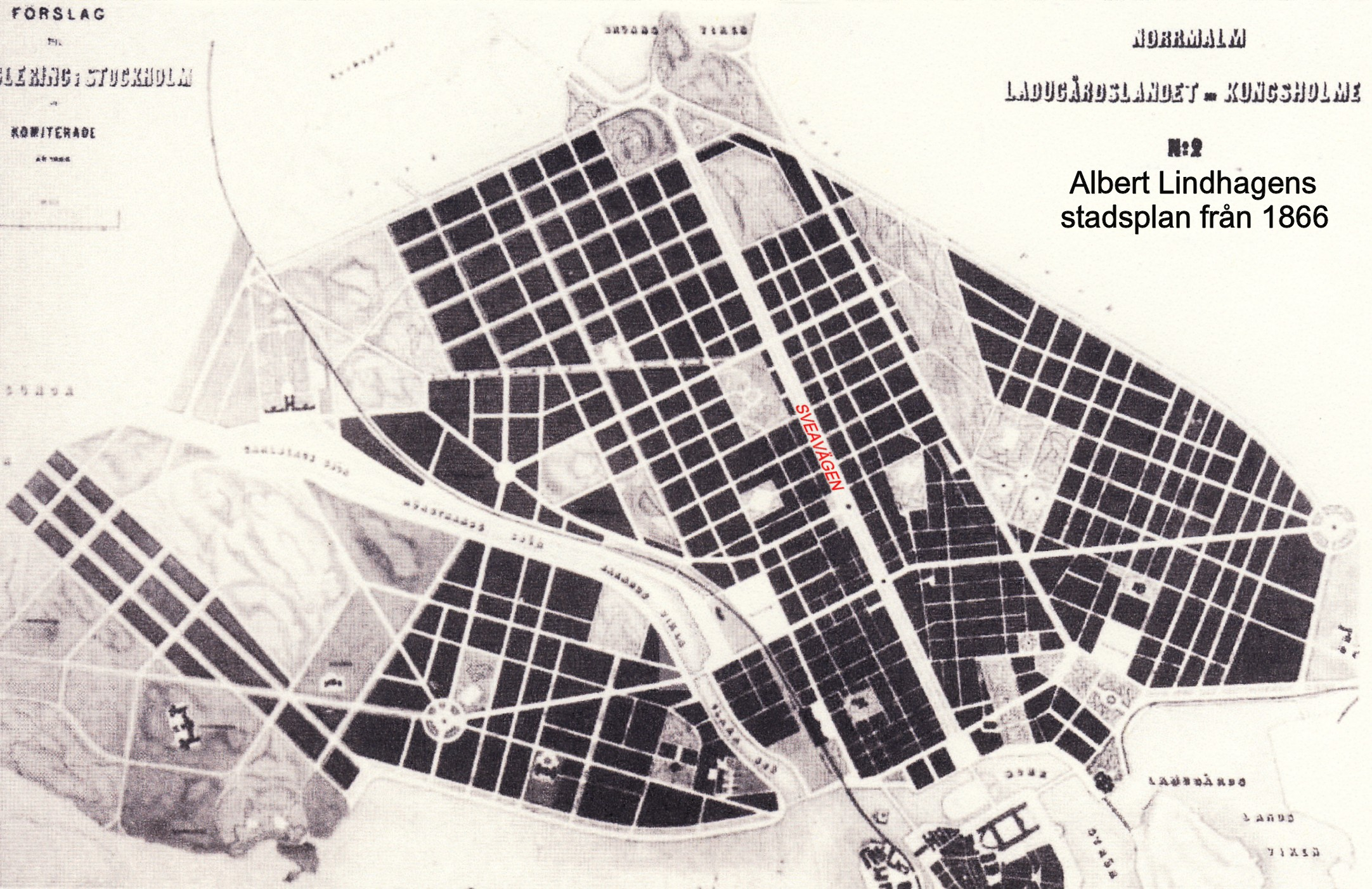
City plan of 1866.

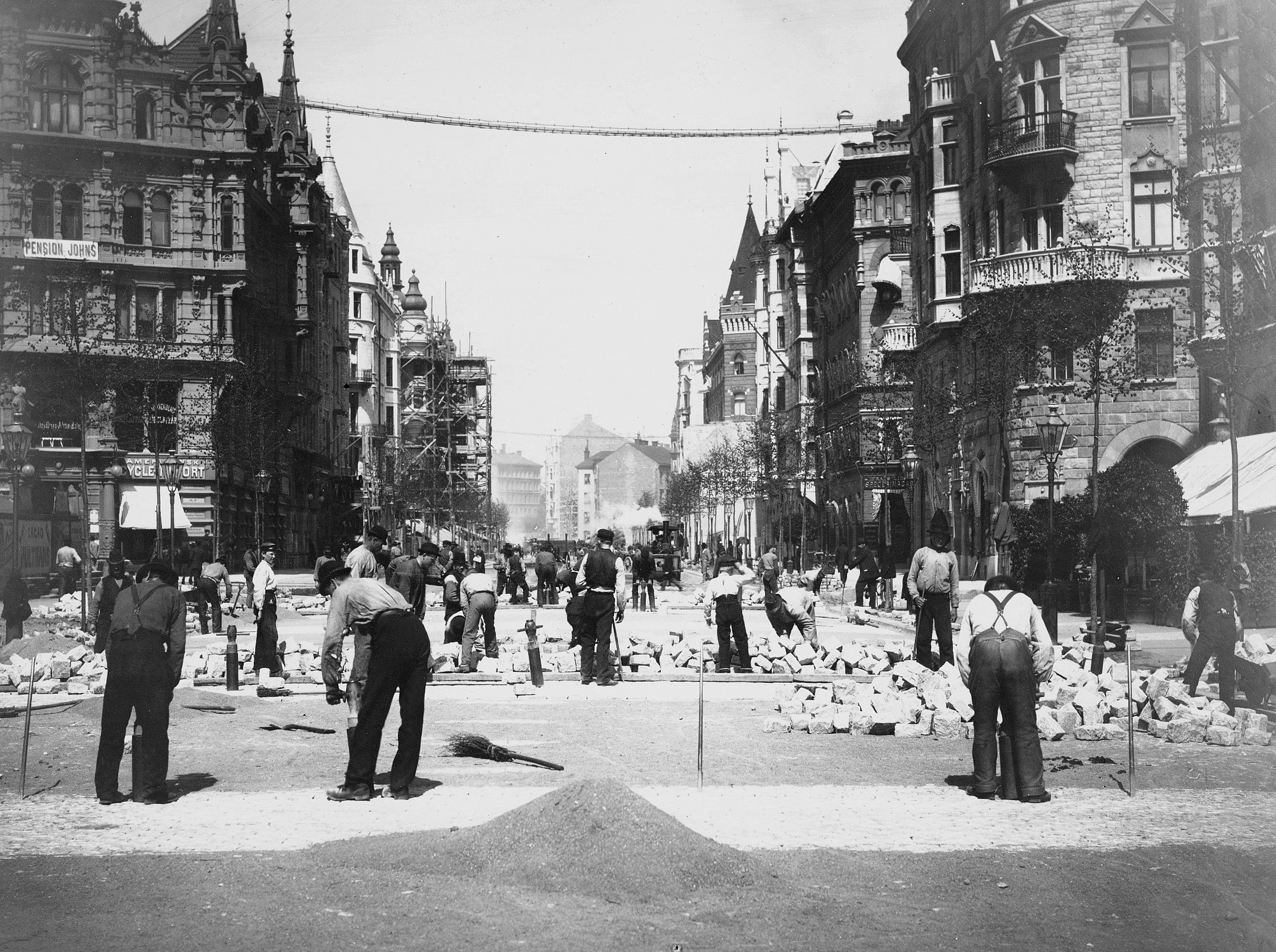
Birger Jarlsgatan being paved in 1898, the continental system of esplanades taking shape.

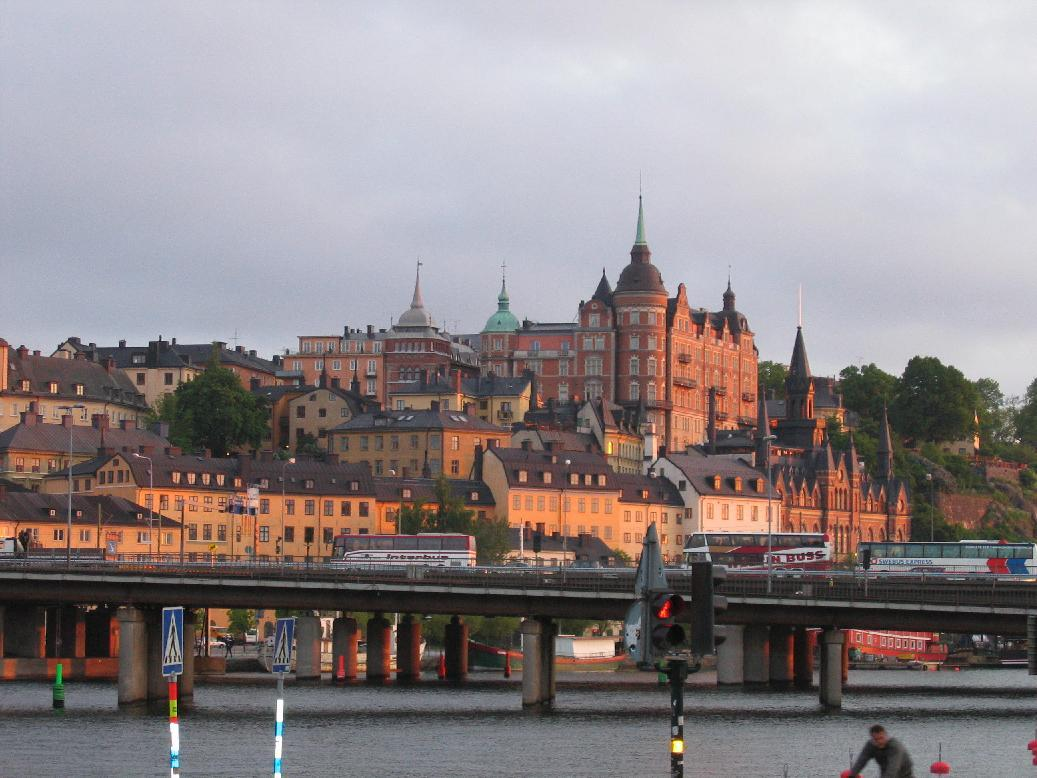
Characteristics of the 1890s, the towers and spires of Mariaberget are today well-known features of the city skyline.

In 1866, a commission led by Albert Lindhagen produced a city plan for the ridges (malmarna) designed to offer citizens light, fresh air and access to Swedish nature by mean of parks and plantations. To this goal, he proposed a system of esplanades culminating in Sveavägen, a 2 km long and 70 m wide boulevard inspired by Champs Elysées. 1877–80 new city plans were finally passed for central Stockholm, which made the city well-prepared for the major expansion that followed. During the 1880s more than 2.000 buildings were added on the ridges and the population grew from 168.000 to 245.000. At the end of the century, less than 40 per cent of the residents were born in Stockholm.

While this demand for housing was mostly dealt with by private entrepreneurs who built on pure speculation, street width and building heights were strictly regulated by the new city plans which ensured the city that evolved was given a uniform design. A trend initiated by the Bünsow House at Strandvägen, the 1880s saw many monumental brick buildings evolve, including Gamla Riksarkivet and the Norstedt Building on Riddarholmen. Before the end of the decade, most new buildings were equipped with electricity and telephones were increasingly common. During the 1890s, the Neo-Renaissance plaster architecture was replaced by structures in brick and natural stone, largely inspired by French Renaissance architecture. Around what still was factories outside the customs of Stockholm, shacks whose sanitary conditions defied all description evolved. Before the end of the century, however, these were transformed into municipal societies, which facilitated regulation of health and construction, and by the turn of the century, the expansion had continued far beyond the city limits, with villa suburbs initiated by individuals adding a mix of purely speculative structures and more qualitative ambitions. The new century saw the introduction of Art Nouveau with the Central Post Office Building by Boberg (1898–1904) and Neo-Baroque with the Riksdag (1894–1906). Throughout the 1910s, trams were electrified and cars were rolling on the streets of Stockholm.

During this period, Stockholm further developed as a cultural and educational centre. In the 19th century, a number of scientific institutes opened in Stockholm, for example the Karolinska Institutet. The General Art and Industrial Exposition, an international exhibition of World's Fair status, was held on the island of Djurgården in 1897.

== 20th century ==
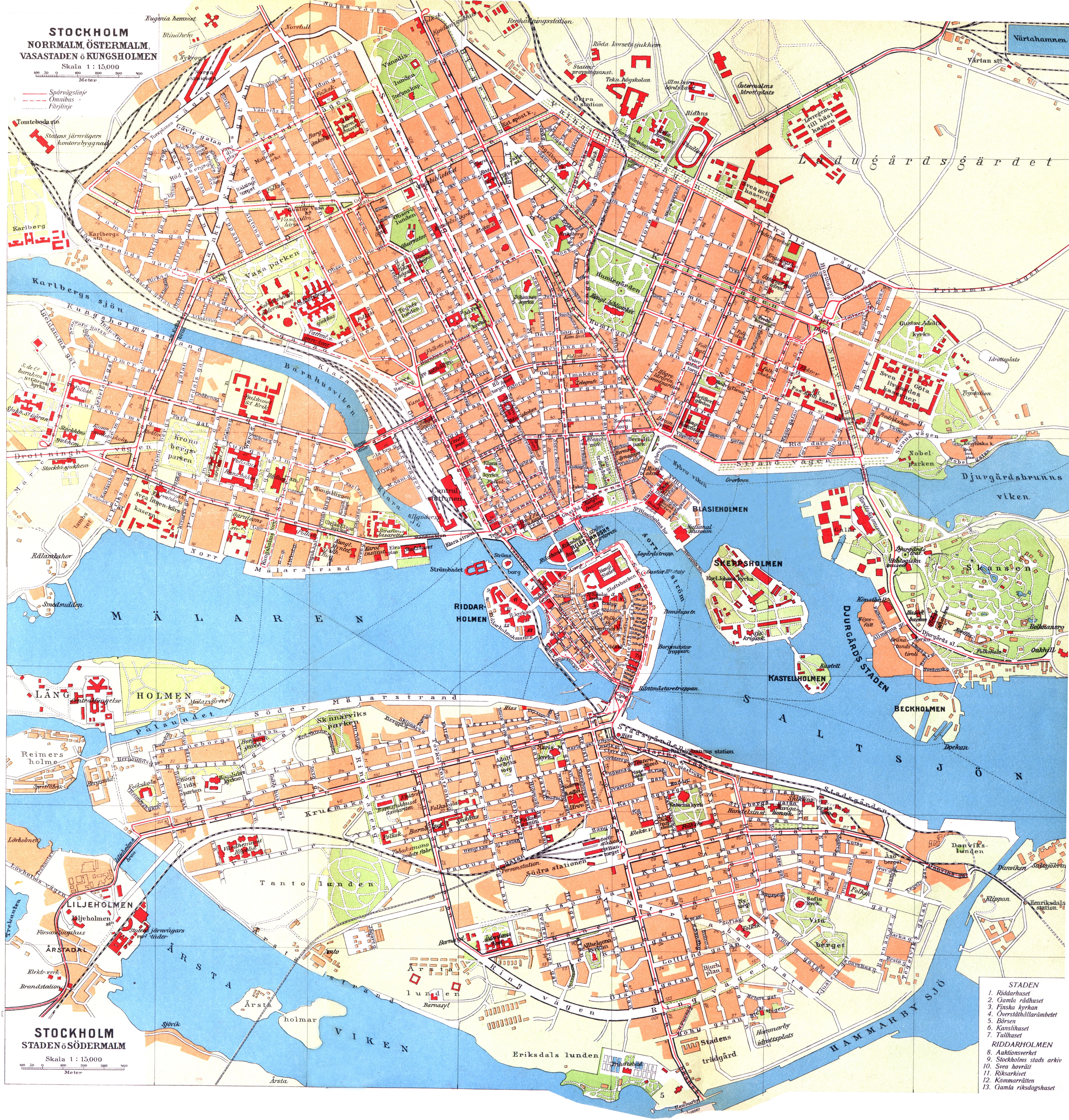
Map of Stockholm in 1928

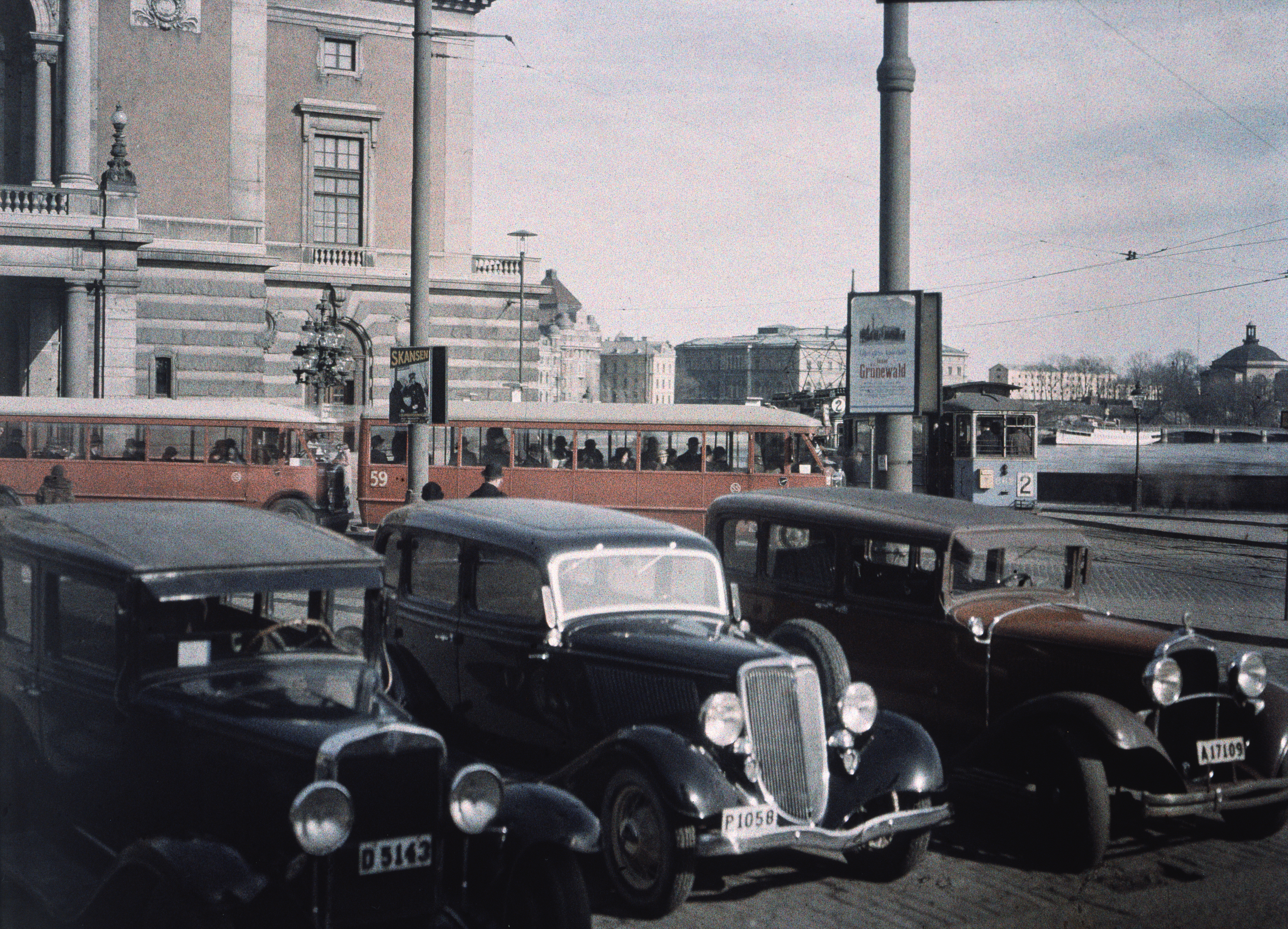
The Royal Swedish Opera in 1934 (Autochrome).

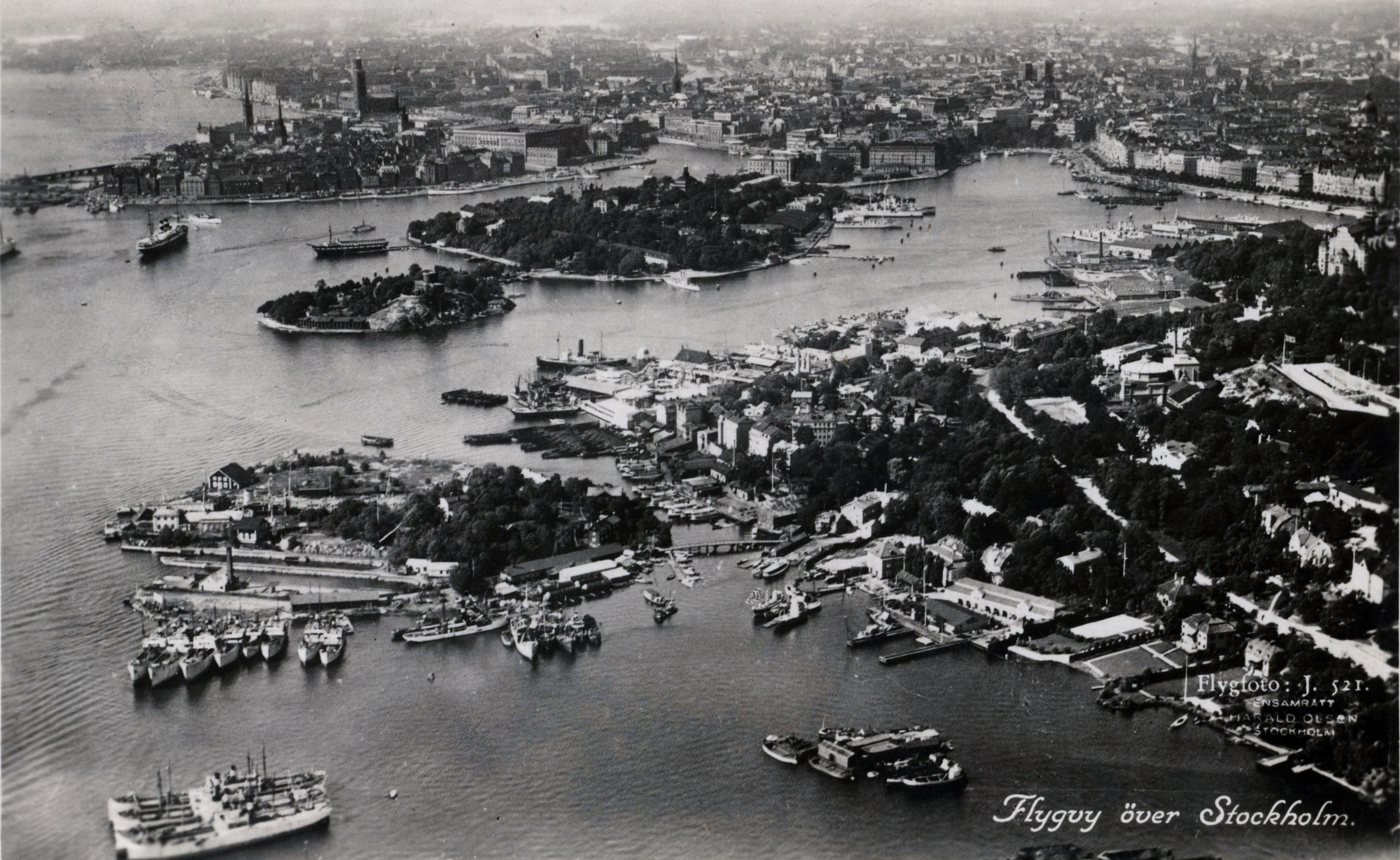
Aerial view of Stockholm before 1935

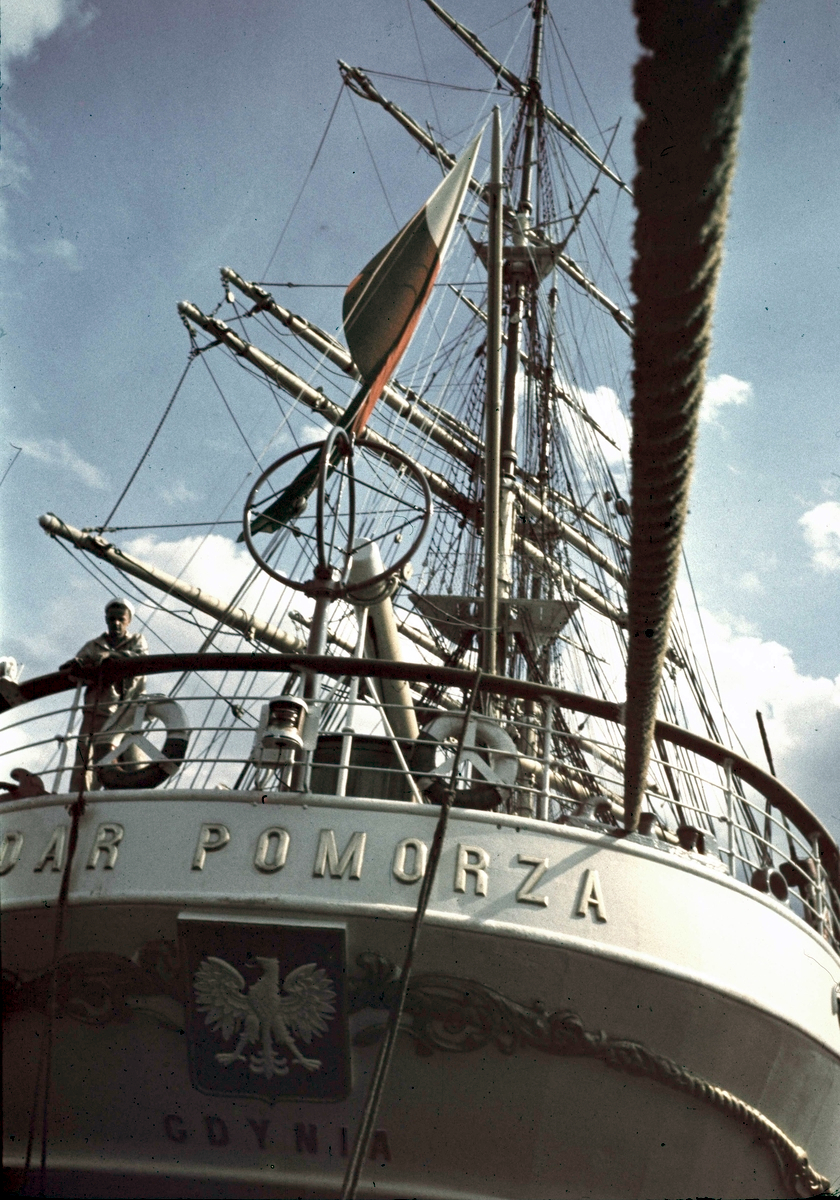
Meeting of training ships from Baltic States in Stockholm (Strandvägen) in June 1938 (Agfacolor).

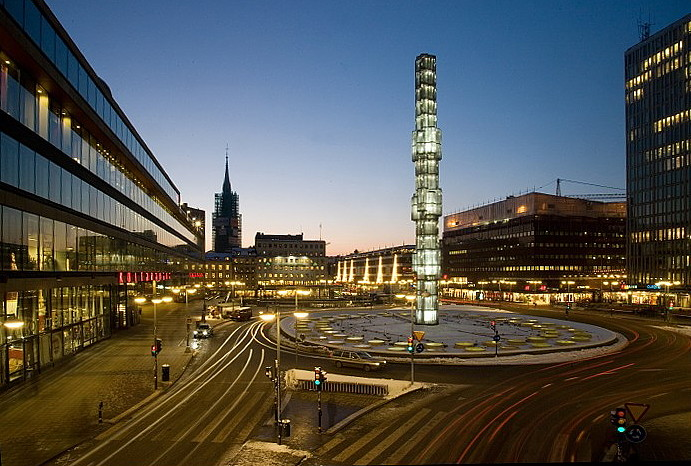
Sergels torg, centre of modernized Stockholm

In the late 20th century, Stockholm became a modern, technologically advanced and ethnically diverse city. Throughout the century, many industries shifted away from work-intensive activities into more high-technology and service-industry knowledge-based areas.

The city continued to expand and new districts were created, some with high proportions of immigrants. Meanwhile, the inner city (Norrmalm) went through a criticised as well as an admired wave of modernisation in the post-war period, the Redevelopment of Norrmalm, securing the city's geographical center as the political and business center for the future.

In 1923 the Stockholm municipal government moved to a new building, the Stockholm City Hall. The Stockholm International Exhibition was held in 1930. In 1967 the city of Stockholm was integrated into Stockholm County.

=== The "Stockholm Initiative" ===
On April 22, 1991, thirty world leaders gathered in Stockholm, among them Ingvar Carlsson, then Prime Minister of Sweden; Willy Brandt, Chair of the Socialist International and former Chancellor of Germany; Julius Nyerere, former President of Tanzania; Gro Harlem Brundtland, prime minister of Norway; Kalevi Sorsa, former prime minister of Finland; Edward Heath, former prime minister of the U. K.; and Benazir Bhutto, former prime minister of Pakistan.

== See also ==
- Timeline of Stockholm history
- Gamla stan
- History of Sweden
- History of Uppland
