= Small nucleolar RNA SNORD53 =

RNA molecule

Small nucleolar RNA SNORD53/SNORD92
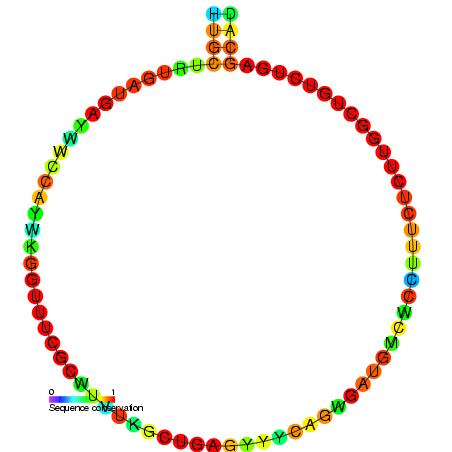
- Predicted secondary structure and sequence conservation of SNORD53_SNORD92

Identifiers
- Symbol: SNORD53_SNORD92
- Alt. Symbols: SNORD53; U53
- Rfam: RF00325

Other data
- RNA type: Gene; snRNA; snoRNA; C/D-box
- Domain: Eukaryota
- GO: GO:0006396 GO:0005730
- SO: SO:0000593
- PDB structures: PDBe

In molecular biology, snoRNA U53 (also known as SNORD53) is a non-coding RNA (ncRNA) molecule which functions in the modification of other small nuclear RNAs (snRNAs). This type of modifying RNA is usually located in the nucleolus of the eukaryotic cell which is a major site of snRNA biogenesis. It is known as a small nucleolar RNA (snoRNA) and also often referred to as a guide RNA.

snoRNA U53 belongs to the C/D box class of snoRNAs which contain the conserved sequence motifs known as the C box (UGAUGA) and the D box (CUGA). Most of the members of the box C/D family function in directing site-specific 2'-O-methylation of substrate RNAs.

U53 was originally cloned from HeLa cells and is predicted to guide the 2'O-ribose methylation of 28S ribosomal RNA (rRNA) at residue C3848. It is related to mouse snoRNA MBII-35
