= Norstedt Building =

Coordinates: 59°19′34.06″N 18°3′47.41″E

Norstedthuset
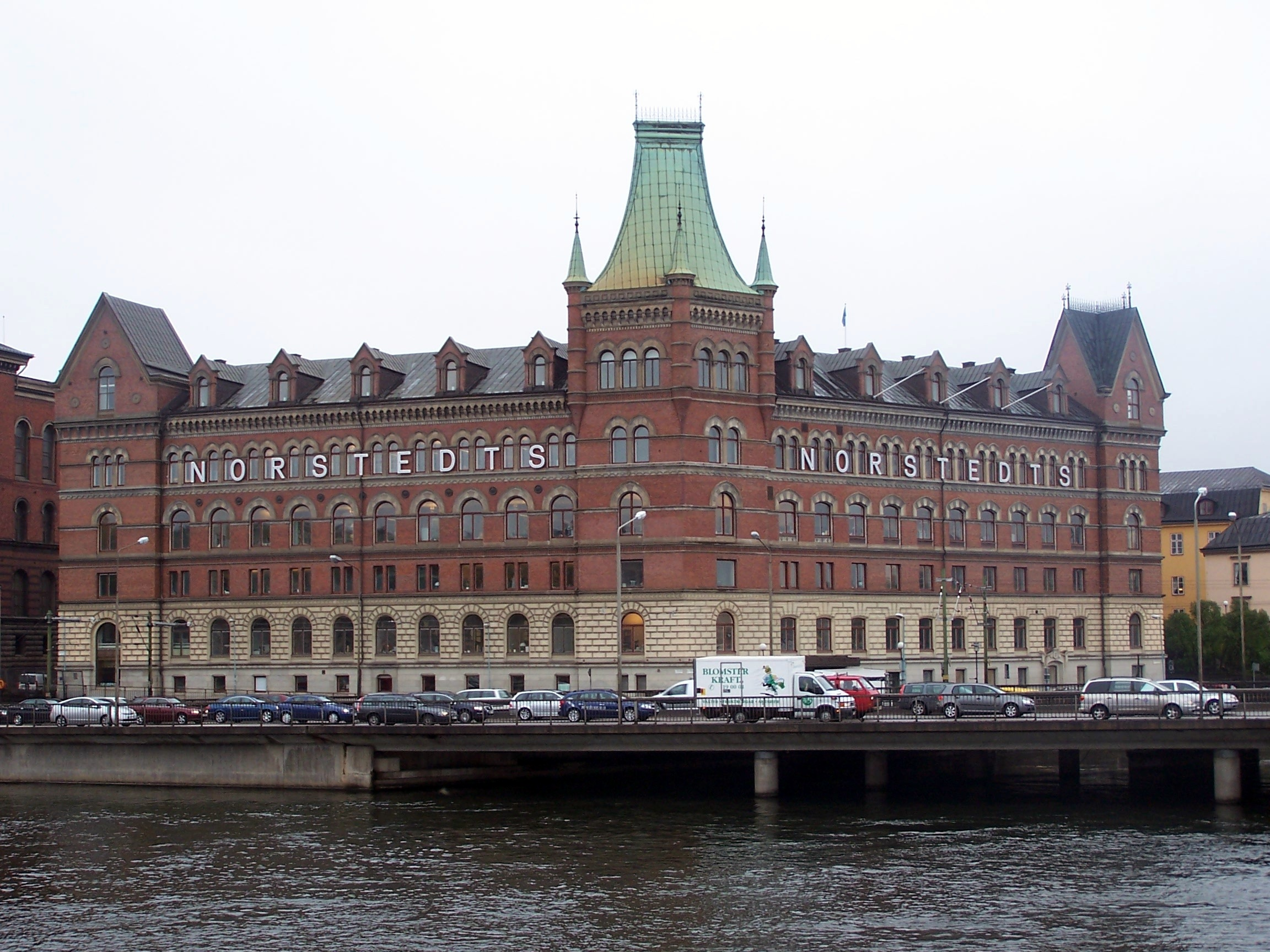
- View of Nordstedtshuset from Vasabron
- Interactive map of the Norstedthuset area

General information
- Location: Stockholm, Sweden
- Construction started: 1882
- Completed: 1889
- Client: P.A. Norstedt & Söner AB

The Norstedt Building (Swedish: Norstedtshuset) is the main office of P.A. Norstedt & Söner AB on Riddarholmen in Stockholm, Sweden.

Designed by Magnus Isæus the building was built in 1882–1891, and features a spire-like roof, which is a well-known silhouette on the skyline of central Stockholm. The Vasabron Bridge passes in front of the building and Gamla Riksarkivet ("Old National Archive") lies south of it.

== See also ==
- Architecture of Stockholm
- List of streets and squares in Gamla stan
