= Gamla Riksarkivet =

Coordinates: 59°19′32.24″N 18°3′50.83″E

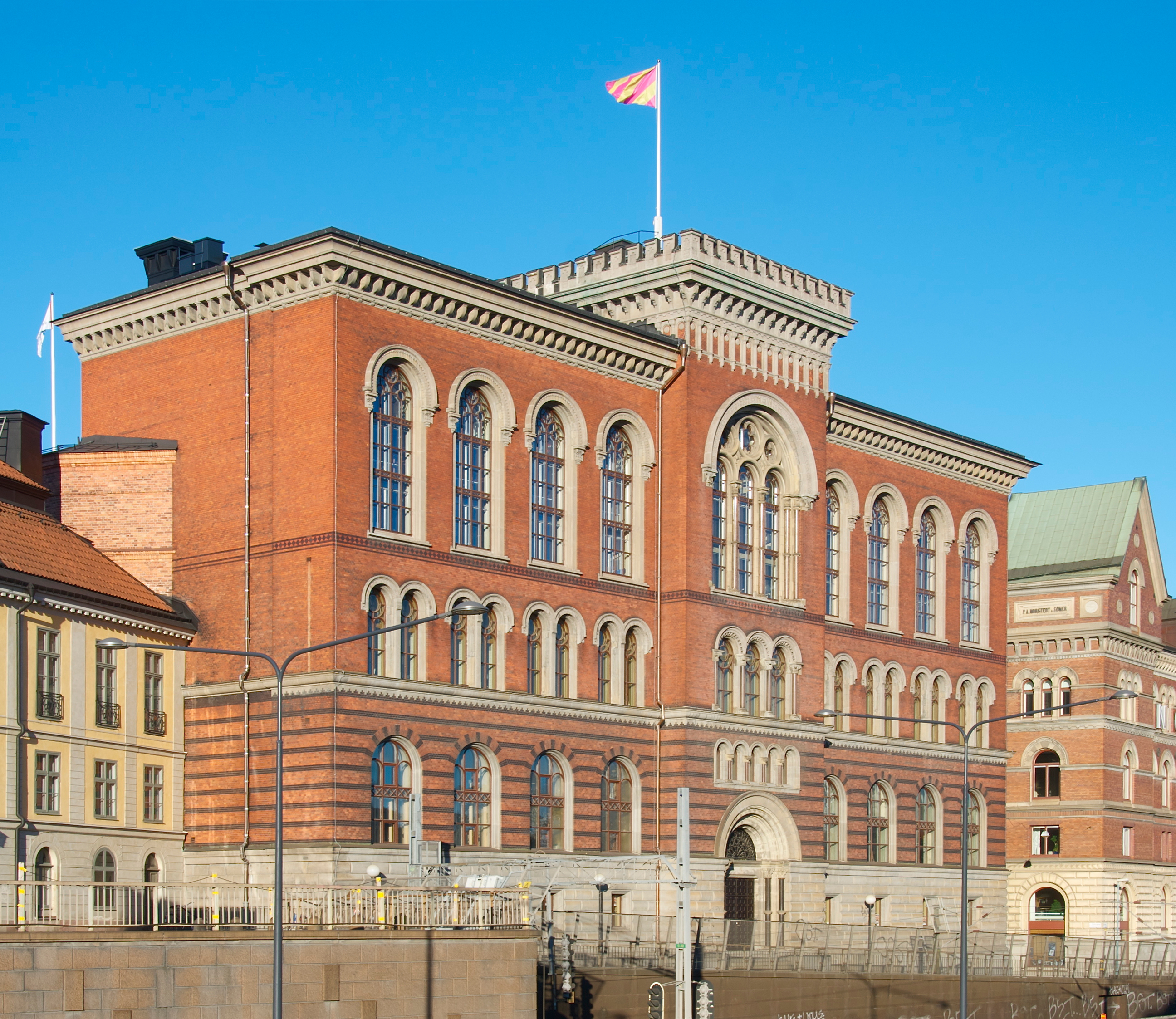
- Gamla Riksarkivet
- Interactive map of the Gamla Riksarkivet area

General information
- Location: Stockholm, Sweden
- Construction started: 1877
- Completed: 1890

Design and construction
- Architect: Axel F. Nyström

Gamla Riksarkivet (Old National Archives) is a building at Arkivgatan 3 on Riddarholmen in Stockholm, Sweden. Riksarkivet, the Swedish National Archives, were located in the building until 1968.

The 19th century Brick Romanesque architecture of the building is alluding to the medieval history of Riddarholmen. The plan of the building is, however, typical for public buildings of its era, the grand style central portion clearly articulated in the façade together with the huge windows of the reading-room. The building is connected to the Stenbock Palace where the archive was once started in 1863. It is also similar in style to the Norstedt Building located just north of it.

== See also ==
- List of streets and squares in Gamla stan
- Architecture of Stockholm
