= German submarine U-53 =

U-53 may refer to one of the following German submarines:

- SM U-53, a Type U 51 submarine launched in 1916 and that served in the First World War until surrendered 1 December 1918; broken up at Swansea in 1922
  - During the First World War, Germany also had these submarines with similar names:
    - SM UB-53, a Type UB III submarine launched in 1917 and sunk on 3 August 1918
    - SM UC-53, a Type UC II submarine launched in 1916 and scuttled on 28 October 1918
- German submarine U-53 (1939), a Type VIIB submarine that served in the Second World War until sunk on 23 February 1940
