= Josabeth Sjöberg =

Swedish artist (1812–1882)

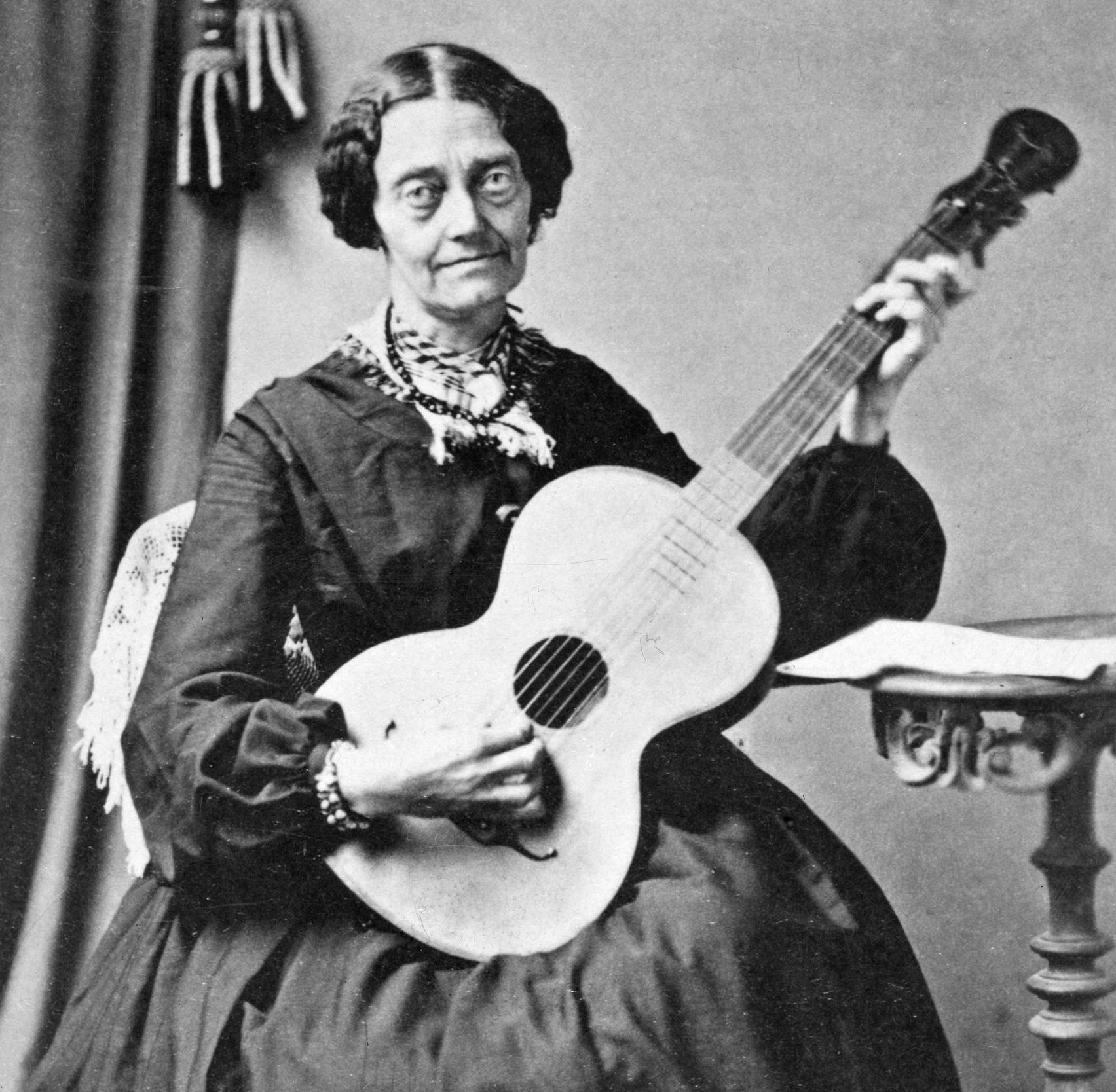
- Josabeth Sjöberg (c.1870)
- Born: 30 June 1812; Katarina Parish, Stockholm, Sweden
- Died: 29 December 1882 (aged 70); Stockholm, Sweden
- Occupations: painter, music teacher

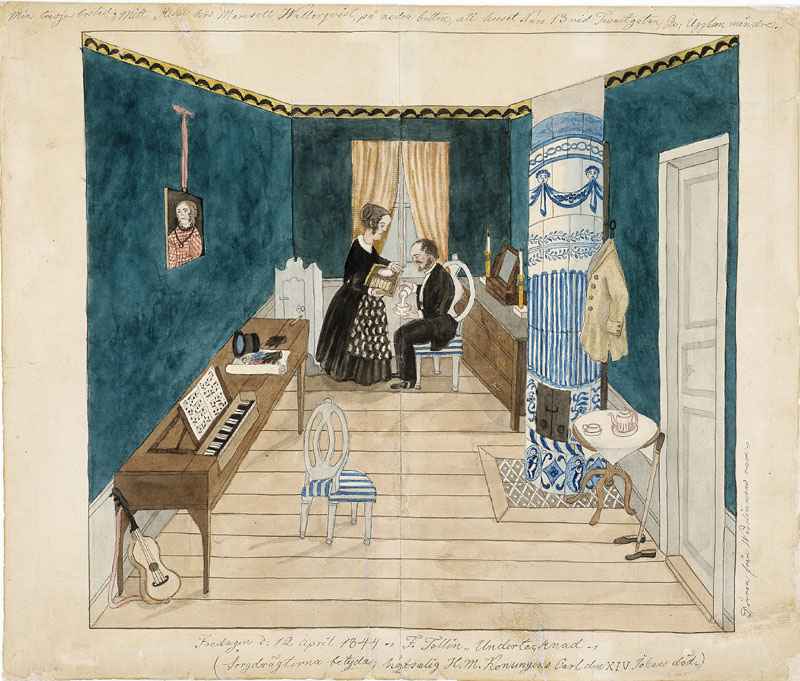
At #13 Tavastgatan, with Ferdinand Tollin (mid 1840s)

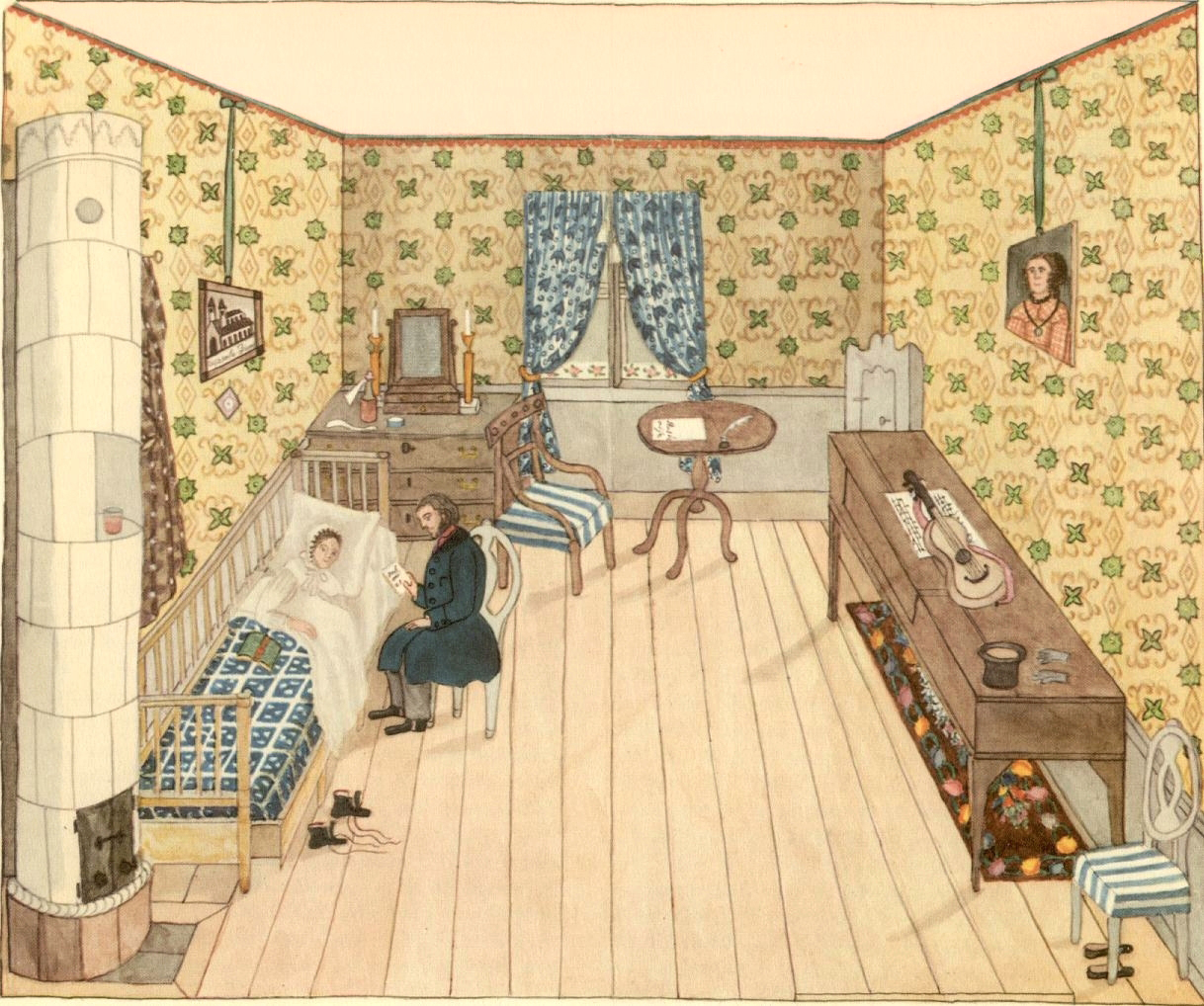
At #60 Högbergsgatan, with Doctor Levin (c.1870)

Josabeth Fredrica Paulina Sjöberg (30 June 1812 – 29 December 1882) was a Swedish painter and music teacher. She is best known for the interior portraits she made of her twelve successive homes in Södermalm, where she spent most of her life. She also did a series of interiors from churches and retirement homes for women.

== Biography ==
Sjöberg was born in Stockholm, Sweden. She came from a family in the upper ranks of the bourgeoisie. Her mother, Johanna Fredrika Wibergsson (1771–1831), was an actor and singer who spent most of her time reading. Her father, Nils Sjöberg. was a Chancellor at the War College, although he may have been musically talented as well. Johanna died when Josabeth was eighteen and Nils followed two years later, leaving her without a means of support. As a result her older brother, Nils, who was a Master Builder's apprentice, became her guardian. They shared an apartment with a widow until she got married, then Josabeth lived by herself.

At that time, it was common for young women of that social stratum to receive music and drawing lessons. It would appear that she was otherwise self-taught. Living very frugally and moving frequently, she was able to support herself doing occasional illustrations for the publisher, Sigfrid Flodin (1827– 1909), and giving music lessons for the guitar and piano. She may also have worked as a governess. An inheritance in the 1860s did little to change her lifestyle, although a change in her painting style indicates that she may have used some of the money for drawing lessons.

Little is known of her social life, although it is assumed that she kept in touch with her two sisters, Sophia and Emilia, and her childhood friends. Ferdinand Tollin (1807–1865), an artist who was a family friend, may have been the one who suggested that she take up painting. One of her nieces recalls the visits of "Mamsell" Sjöberg (as she was known) and remembers her as always wearing a large black hat and carrying a box of watercolors. It was said that she was also quite clumsy and was generally in poor health. One of her watercolors shows her receiving medical attention from Doctor Knut Fabian Levin (1818–1888) for what was likely a breast tumor.

Shortly before her death in Stockholm during 1882, she had become so ill that she was moved to a combination poorhouse and nursing home known as Grubbens on Kungsholmen. After her death, her paintings passed to the family of a friend, apparently per her will. By the 1930s, they had become dispersed, but they were collected by the Stockholm City Museum in 1936 and have been displayed several times in art exhibitions, including the 700-year jubilee of the city of Stockholm.

Despite the technical naivete of her works, they have been widely used to illustrate books and articles on the culture of 19th century Stockholm. In 1968, a public staircase in Södermalm was named after her.
