= Nicodemus Tessin =

Nicodemus Tessin may refer to:

- Nicodemus Tessin the Elder (1615–1681), Swedish architect
- Nicodemus Tessin the Younger (1654–1728), Swedish architect
