= Hebbes Bro =

Footbridge in Stockholm, Sweden

Coordinates: 59°19′26.2″N 18°03′57.8″E

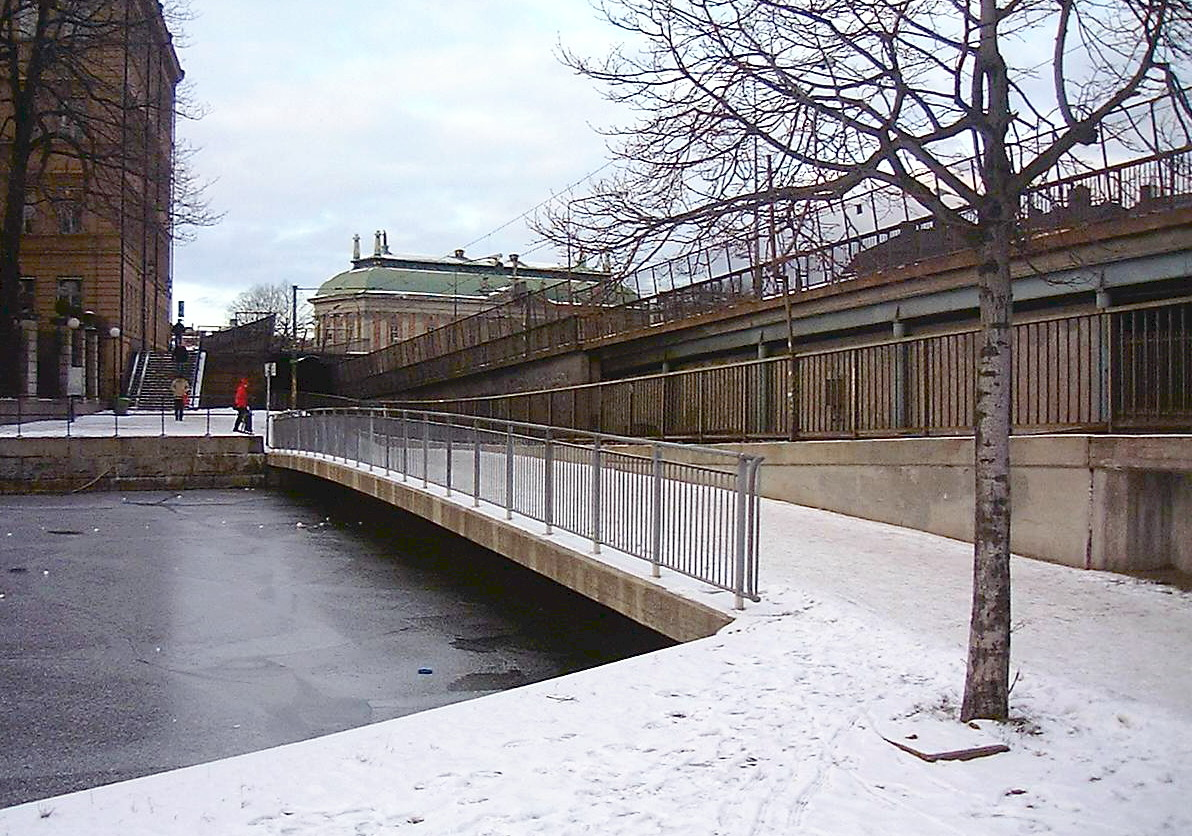
Hebbes bro in February 2007.

Hebbes bro (Swedish: "Bridge of Hebbe") is a pedestrian bridge in Gamla stan, the old town of Stockholm, Sweden, connecting the two islands Riddarholmen and Stadsholmen.

The bridge was given the name in 1924 after the building next to it owned by Simon Hebbe (1726–1803), manager at the East India Company, shipowner, and head of division of the national board of trade. In 1856-1866 the building in question was incorporated into the Old Parliament Building, which until 1905 was the location for the Riksdag.

== See also ==
- Hebbes Trappa
- List of streets and squares in Gamla stan
- List of bridges in Stockholm
- Riddarholmsbron
- Centralbron
