= Natalya Pasichnyk =

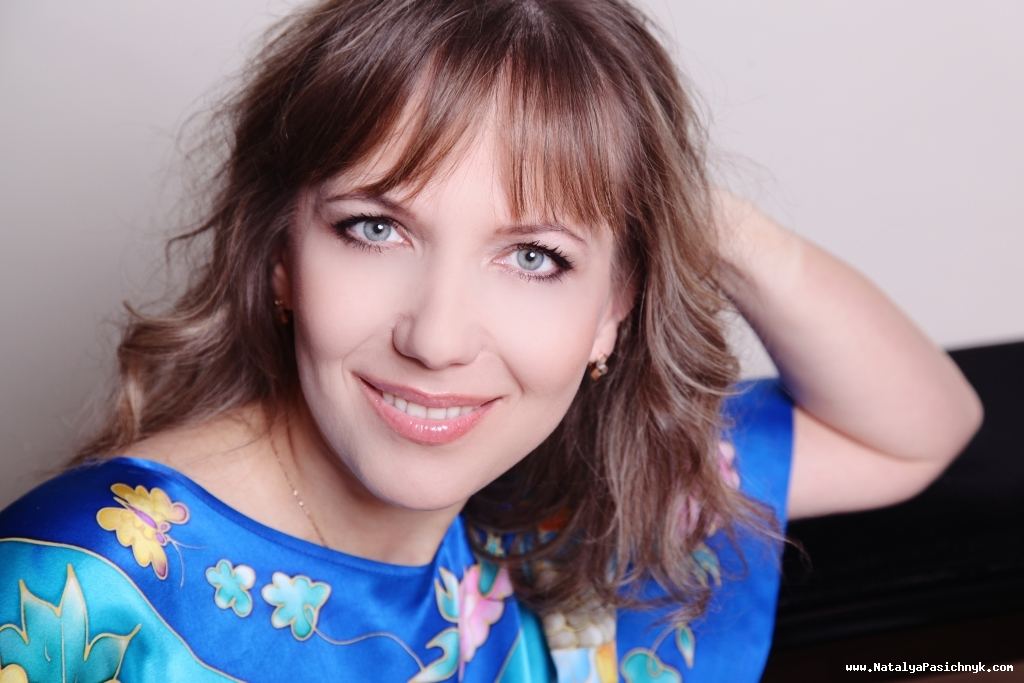
Image of Natalya

Natalya Pasichnyk (Ukrainian: Наталя Пасічник), born 13 February 1971, is a Swedish-Ukrainian classical pianist. She lives in Stockholm.

== Biography ==
Born in Rivne, Ukraine, Natalya is the daughter of Igor and Jadwiga (née Antonovich) Pasichnyk. Her father became the first rector of National University of Ostroh Academy when it was revived in 1994. Her sister is the soprano Olga Pasichnyk.

She is the first Swedish musician to win the Global Music Awards gold medal in 2024.

Natalya started her musical studies at the age of three. After graduating from the Music Boarding School in Lviv she continued at the Lviv National Musical Academy, M. Lysenko for professor Josef Örmeny. She then finished her postgraduate studies for professor Andrzej Stefański at the Chopin University of Music in Warsaw and for Staffan Scheja at the Royal Swedish Academy of Music.

Natalya has performed widely, both as soloist and chamber musician, often with her sister Olga. She has appeared throughout Europe, USA, Argentina and Japan, in concert halls such as Suntory Hall (Tokyo), Teatro Colón in Buenos Aires, Berwaldhallen (Stockholm), Konserthuset (Stockholm), deSingel (Antwerp), Auditori Winterthur (Barcelona), Laeiszhalle (Hamburg), Warsaw Philharmonic, NOSPR concert hall, National forum of music in Wroclaw, Poznań Philharmonic, Baltic National Philharmonic, at festivals such as Ludwig van Beethoven Easter Festival and Mozart festival, International Chopin and his Europe Music Festival, Schubertiada (Spain), Duszniki International Chopin Piano Festival, Three Choirs Festival, St Magnus International Festival, Nordlysfestivalen, La Folle Journée de Varsovie, Gdansk Piano Autumn (Poland), European Festival: Ukrainian Spring. She cooperated with the Swedish Radio Symphony Orchestra, Mozarteum Orchestra Salzburg (Austria), Orchestre d'Auvergne (France), Royal Stockholm Philharmonic Orchestra, Lviv National Philharmonic Orchestra, Kremerata Baltica, Philharmonic Orchestra of Kraków, Wrocław Philharmonic, Helsingborg Symphony Orchestra, Polish- Baltic Philharmonic, Gdańsk and Poznań Philharmonic Orchestra (Poland), Covent Garden Chamber Orchestra, INSO-Lviv, NorrlandsOperan (Sweden) under the direction of conductors such as Christopher Hogwood, Evgeniy Svetlanov, Arie van Beck, Jacek Kaspszyk, Marek Mos, B Tommy Andersson, Gidon Kremer, Tobias Ringborg, David Niemann and Robert Stehli.

She is prizewinner of the Fifth Nordic Piano Competition in Nyborg (Denmark, 1998), the World Piano Competition in Cincinnati (USA, 1999), and special prize winner of the Umberto Micheli International Piano Competition. 2000 she received the Anders Wall foundation Giresta prize. In 2017 she was awarded Stockholm City's Culture grant, based on her contribution to Stockholm's cultural life and in 2022 Church of Sweden's Culture Prize. In 2024 she was awarded the Bo Bringborn musical prize, the Nils Göran Olves foundation's music prize and is the 2024 Gold Medal winner of the Global Music Awards for her recording Rethinking the Well-Tempered Clavier of J. S. Bach. In 2025 she received the Culture Prize of the Swedish Foundation Renaissance for the Humanities at Prince Eugen's Waldemarsudde in the presence of H. M. Queen Silvia. She is the artistic director of European Festival: Ukrainian Spring. She appears in the award-winning documentary Ukrainian Rhapsody broadcast by Swedish Television.

Natalya holds the degree of Doctor of Arts from Stanisław Moniuszko Academy of Music in Gdańsk and Doctor of Philosophy in Artistic Research from Grieg Academy, University of Bergen.

Natalya Pasichnyk is the founder and director of the Ukrainian Institute in Sweden – a cultural-diplomatic organization based in Strömsborg in Stockholm. She is affiliated to the Royal College of Music, Stockholm.

== Discography ==
- Rethinking the Well-Tempered Clavier (Navona Records, 2024)
- The spirit of Freedom (Fundazja Art Forma, 2023)
- Regamey & Regamey. Pasiecznik & Pasiecznik (Polmic 162–163, 2021)
- Consolation – Forgotten Treasures of the Ukrainian Soul (BIS records, 2016)
- The Fourth Dimension (Musicon, 2005) – Bach and Messiaen
- Musik i Giresta kyrka (True Track production, 2000)
- Mozart, W. A.: Concert Arias ("Bella mia fiamma ...") (CD Accord, 2012)
- Chopin – complete songs (NAXOS, 2010)
- Wolfgang Amadeus Mozart – Complete songs (Pro Musica Camerata, 2006)
- Felix Mendelssohn-Bartholdy | Antonin Dvorak (Pro Musica Camerata, 2003)
- Dumky – Popular Ukrainian songs for voice and piano (OPUS111, 2001)
