= Ukrainian Institute in Sweden =

A non-profit organization that promotes awareness of Ukrainian

The Ukrainian Institute in Sweden
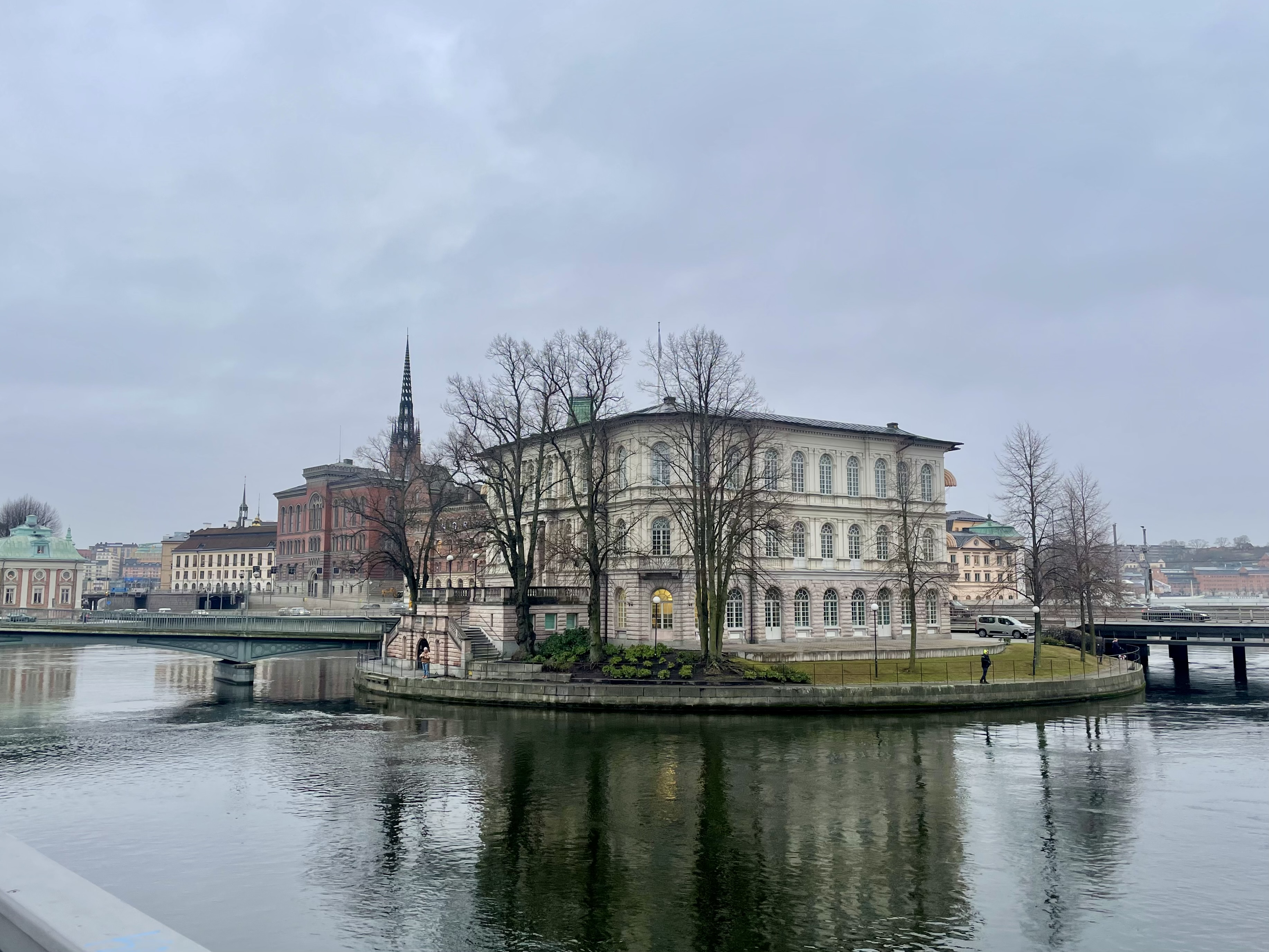
- Formation: 2014
- Founder: Natalya Pasichnyk
- Location: Stockholm, Sweden
- Website: www.ukrainskainstitutet.se

The Ukrainian Institute in Sweden is a public organization founded in Stockholm in 2014 by the Ukrainian-Swedish pianist Natalya Pasichnyk. Its mission is to spread Ukraine's cultural heritage and promote better understanding and knowledge of Ukrainian culture and history in Sweden.

== History ==
=== Establishment and governance ===
The Ukrainian Institute in Sweden was founded on 24 August 2014 by Ukrainian established classical pianist Natalya Pasichnyk. The founding itself was a private initiative with no government funding, but the Ukrainian embassy in Sweden and the Ukrainian minister of culture Yevhen Nyshchuk voiced their support of the initiative. The launch was celebrated with a support concert for Ukraine held at Confidencen 1 September 2014. A joint declaration of intent was signed In July the following year by the institute, the Ukrainian Embassy in Sweden and the Ukrainian Ministry of Culture. Another three-party declaration was signed the same month between Sweden, The Ukrainian Institute in Sweden and the Ukrainian embassy. The parties promised to promote Ukrainian arts and culture within Sweden and to facilitate cultural exchange. Natalya Pasichnyk has helmed the institute as its director. Anastasia Klyonova, a Ukrainian Professional Support Center project lead, has previously served as the institute's vice director.

In 2015, the Ukrainian Institute in Sweden evolved the first Ukraine-centric organization to become an associate member of the European Union National Institutes of Culture (EUNIC) Stockholm cluster.

In December 2023, the Institute moved its operations to Strömsborg.

=== Activities ===
The Ukrainian Institute in Sweden supports Ukrainian artists, introducing their creative works to the world publicly. For this purpose, the institute has organized and financed concerts, festivals, exhibitions, film screenings, theatre tours, and other cultural events.

For several years, the Institute organized the Nordic Ukrainian Film Festival. The institute also organized Ukrainian language courses for foreigners cooperating with the Ostroh Academy.

In 2023, the Ukrainian Institute in Sweden, with the participation of partners of EUNIC, in cooperation with the European Commission, held the "European Festival: Ukrainian Spring". The festival ended with a performance by the Lviv National Symphony Orchestra led by Yaroslav Shemet, the first performance of a Ukrainian symphony orchestra in Sweden.

The second edition of the European Festival: Ukrainian Spring took place in Sweden 24 April–7 May 2024 with the grand final starring Latvian violinist Gidon Kremer and the chamber orchestra Kremerata Baltica. The new festival concept presented Ukraine as an integral part of a common European cultural heritage.
