= Centralbron =

Bridge in central Stockholm, Sweden

Coordinates: 59°19′24.6″N 18°04′00.4″E

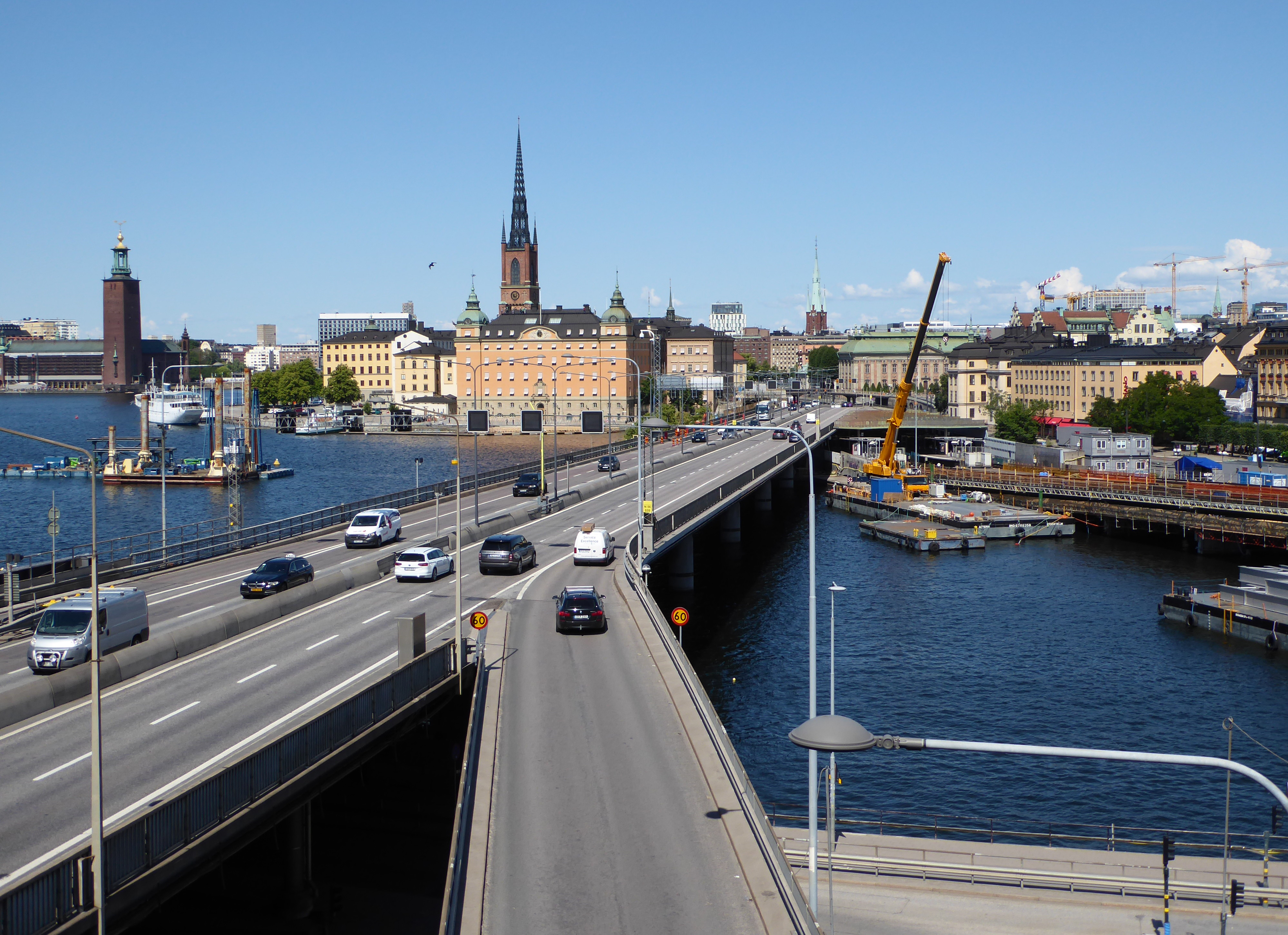
Centralbron viewed from Södermalm. In the background from left to right: Stockholm City Hall, Riddarholmen, and Gamla stan.

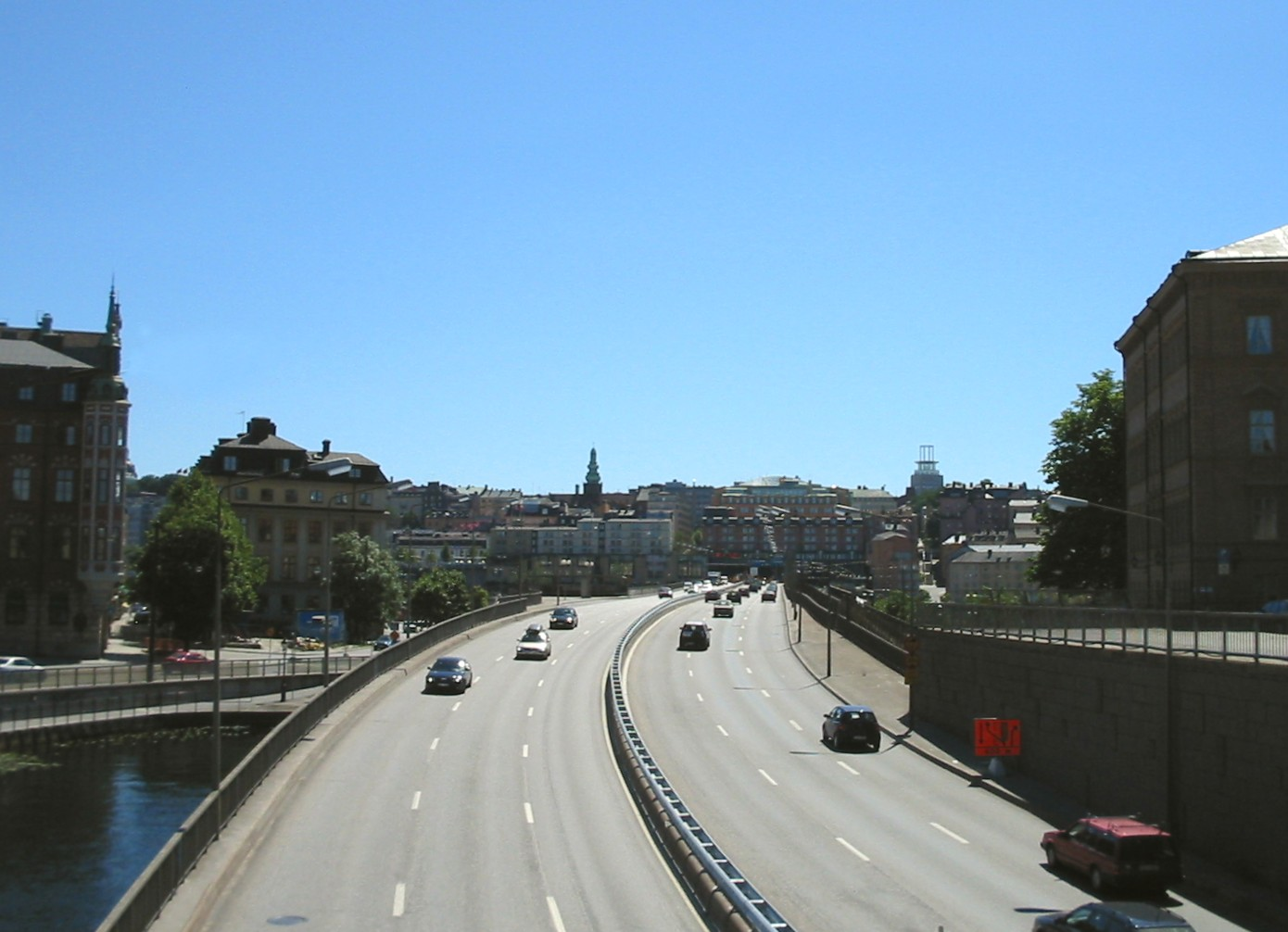
View southbound from Riddarholmsbron.

Centralbron (Swedish: [sɛnˈtrɑ̂ːlˌbruːn], "The Central Bridge") is a major bridge in central Stockholm, Sweden, connecting the northern district Norrmalm to the southern Södermalm.

It is 1,200 metres long and consists of two viaducts passing over Söderström ("Southern Stream") and Riddarfjärden close to Norrström ("Northern Stream") with an interjacent elevated section traversing Riddarholmskanalen and the adjacent eastern waterfront of Riddarholmen. Centralbron has a capacity for 130,000 cars per day. It is paralleled by the bridges (Södra and Norra järnvägsbron) and the tunnel of a two-track railway used by the commuter and freight trains. Centralbron does partly go on top of the Metro which opened on this stretch 1957 and planned together with the bridge.

Nearby bridges include Riddarholmsbron, Vasabron, Strömsborgsbron, and Hebbes Bro.

== Background ==
Since the first decade of the 20th century, numerous proposals labelled "Centralbron" had been produced and more than 20 of them scrapped before the elaboration of the general plan of 1928. During the 1930s the need for a "central bridge" crossing Gamla stan, the old city, declined due to the realization of the plans for a western traffic route, Västerbron, and the clover-shaped traffic junction at Slussen, both finally inaugurated in 1935.

In 1930 plans for a Centralbron was therefore substituted by a temporary solution, by its customers dubbed Slingerbultsleden ("The Dodge Route"), criss-crossing the western streets of Gamla stan using two temporary bridges crossing Riddarholmskanalen to open out on Vasabron. While the metro system and Centralbron were being constructed Slingerbultsleden had to be scrapped, and in 1953 it was substituted by a 240-metre-long (790 ft) pontoon bridge connecting the northern end of the now non-existent Riddarholmskajen ("Quay of Riddarholmen") to Klara strand. Its 7 metres wide roadway had a maximum capacity of 20,000 cars per day and remained in use until the completion of the northern bridge in 1967.

== The southern bridge ==
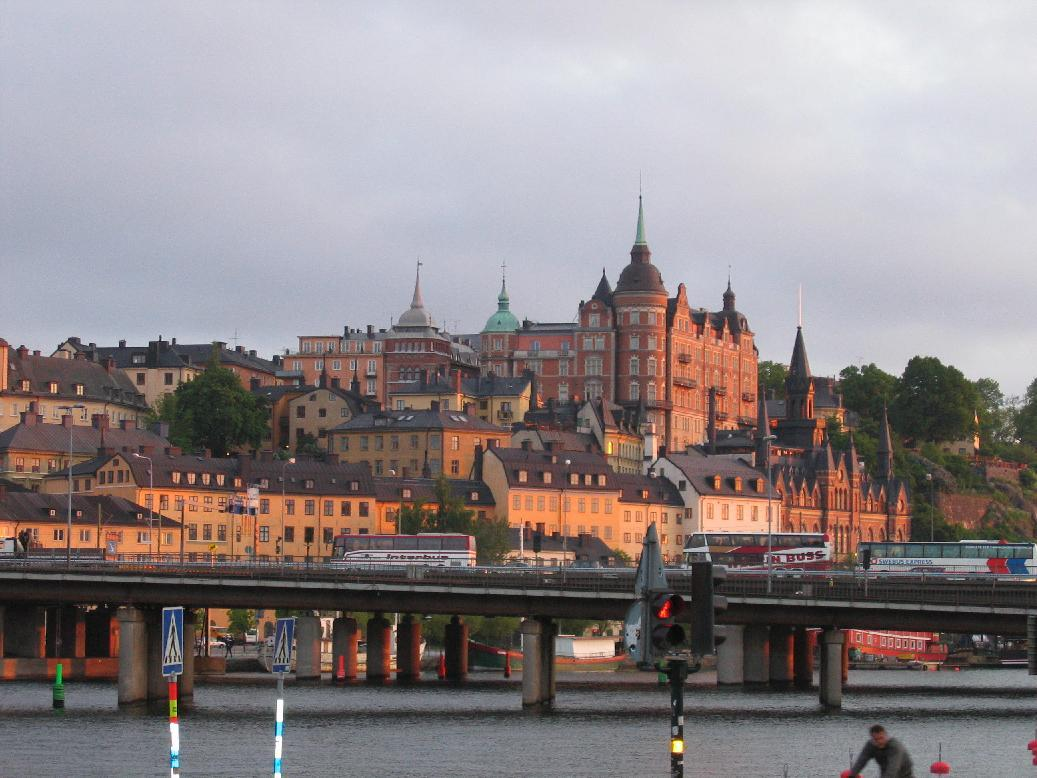
The southern bridge leading from Gamla stan and Riddarholmen over to Södermalm.

WW2 further delayed any attempts to elaborate a permanent solution, but in 1947 a decision to build a southern bridge crossing Söderström was taken, and work finally begun in 1950. The 189-metre-long (620 ft) and 21.3-metre-wide (70 ft) bridge stretches over six spans with a maximum span of 33.7 metres. The continuous steel girders of the roadway are resting on concrete pillars firmly anchored to the soil by numerous poles.

To the south, another two spans are stretching some 46 metres over Söder Mälarstrand ("Southern Shore of Lake Mälaren") before three smaller spans hands the roadway over to Söderledstunneln ("The Southern Route Tunnel"). To the north, the bridge is continuous with a 173-metre-long (568 ft) viaduct passing over the Gamla stan metro station, opened 1957. The viaduct is made of a concrete roadway resting on steel girders.

The entire structure was completed and inaugurated June 16, 1959 and the name 'Centralbron' made official by a naming committee that assumed a Österbron ("The Eastern Bridge") would be built, thus making Centralbron a truly 'central' bridge. An eastern route is as of 2008 not a timely topic, for several reasons but particularly because of the Royal National City Park taking up most of the area east of the city, thus making such a route infeasible. There is however a Western Bridge.

== The northern bridge ==
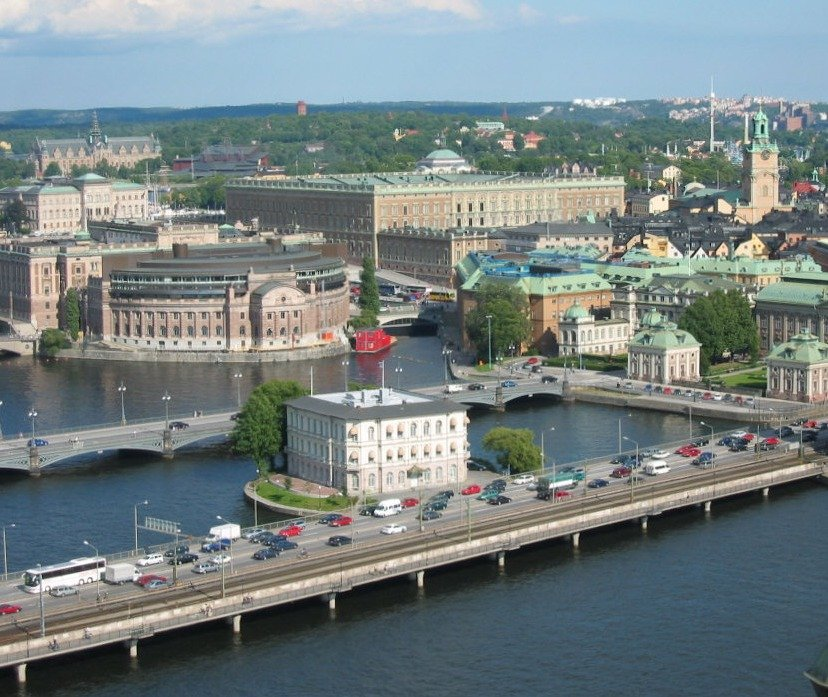
The islet Strömsborg with Centralbron passing in front and Vasabron behind.

The realization of the northern bridge stretching over Norrström had to be postponed until the enlargement of the traffic junction at Tegelbacken was resolved in 1961. The bridge, finally inaugurated September 3, 1967, is a 246-metre-long (807 ft) and 22.3-metre-wide (73 ft) reinforced concrete structure with an average span of 19 meters. To the north, it makes a sharp turn to the west where it extends over the railway, and connects to Klarastrandsleden. The bridge over the railway replaced a level crossing nicknamed Tegelbackseländet ("The Tegelbacken misery"), since it created long traffic jams as an effect of the 1960s traffic increase.

== Criticism and replacement proposals ==
Over the years, Centralbron together with a suggested additional railway track have been much criticized and debated because of their unwieldy and rumbling presence in a delicate historical setting.

Lately, the construction of a tunnel to replace them has been suggested. The cost of such a tunnel, several billion kronor, has put this on hold without any time set. A new metro tunnel has also been suggested because the metro goes below and parallel to Centralbron, making it a total of seven rail tracks and six road lanes crossing the water south of Gamla Stan on bridges. A new railway tunnel, Citybanan, opened for traffic in 2017 and diverted commuter trains from the surface alignment, while other rail traffic continued to use the route via Stockholm Central. The major reconstruction works on the Getingmidjan bottleneck were completed with the 2020 summer closure, followed by shorter weekend closures in 2021. Works in the area continued after 2021, including platform renovations at Stockholm Central during 2021–2026 and track and switch renewals between Tegelbacken and Ulriksdal during 2020–2025. In the streets immediately north of Centralbron, redevelopment of Tegelbacken and Rödbodtorget began in 2024 and was scheduled to continue until 2026; the rebuilt connection from Vasagatan to Centralbron was intended to reduce traffic speeds and improve safety.

After 2021, discussion about Centralbron and the adjoining rail corridor increasingly focused on redevelopment rather than on any immediate tunnel replacement. In 2025, Stockholm opened a public consultation on the Centralstaden proposal, under which the rail area between Centralbron in the south and Kungsbron in the north would be decked over to allow expansion of Stockholm Central and the creation of new public spaces and buildings. Trafikverket stated that its separate government-ordered study of Stockholm Central and Tomteboda proposed longer and wider platforms, a new passenger passage, and reconstruction of Tomteboda yard, with capacity for about 40 percent more trains; as of early 2026, however, the project still depended on further decisions in the national infrastructure plan. In 2025, a state-backed research project also presented four future scenarios for Centralbron, including alternatives with fewer traffic lanes and more space for pedestrians and cyclists.

== See also ==
- List of bridges in Stockholm
- History of Stockholm
