= Ferdinand Tollin =

Swedish writer

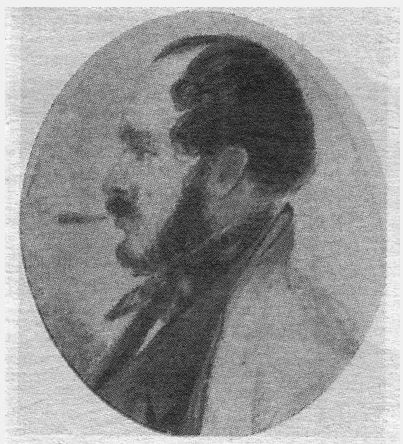
Ferdinand Tollin (Self-portrait?)

Ferdinand Tollin (8 March 1807, Gävle - after 1856, probably in Switzerland) was a Swedish inventor, engineer, painter, illustrator and writer.

== Biography ==
He was born to Olof Tollin, an itinerant merchant. His family was very poor and much of his primary education was financed by friends and other relatives. After graduating, he went to Uppsala, where he earned a law degree in 1831. He then became a clerk in the Criminal Division of the Court of Appeals. Upon moving to Stockholm, he was hired by the Sveriges Riksbank. Soon, he became bored and disillusioned with his duties, ignored his work, and began to give drawing and painting lessons.

He also invented a device for printing sequential numbers on banknotes, which he patented in 1835. The Riksbank purchased a prototype of the device, but claimed that it failed to work properly and, in 1838, demanded a refund, which forced him into bankruptcy. After that, he supported himself by providing illustrations for magazines. Later, this would give him the opportunity to publish accusations that Carl Broing, head of the Bank's printing office, had stolen his idea. Later, he patented and published a design for an airplane, but nothing came of it.

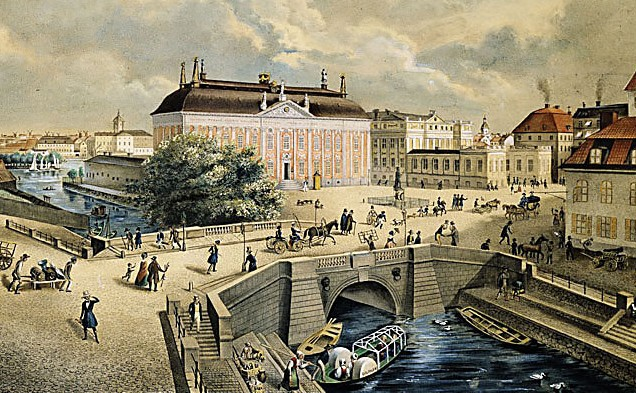
Riddarholmsbron

In the 1840s, he turned to drawings that were made into lithographs by Johan Henric Strömer; mostly views of Stockholm. He spent over three years creating a panoramic view of the city from Mosebacke, which he had hoped to exhibit at the Royal Swedish Academy of Fine Arts, but the Academy's Director, Axel Gillberg, rejected the submission on the grounds of what he described as Tollin's "impertinence". It was eventually exhibited at some minor venues, then disappeared, only to be rediscovered in the 1930s and displayed at the Stockholm City Museum.

After that experience, his works took a political and satirical turn and it was, in fact, as a political cartoonist that he became best known during his lifetime. Some of his favorite targets were King Karl XIV Johan, Count Magnus Brahe, Bishop Christopher Isac Heurlin and Archbishop Carl Fredrik af Wingård, as well as the police and bureaucrats in general. His personal hatreds also found their way into his work. Under the pseudonym, "J. L. Nygren", he published a book with the sarcastic title, "Help for Loan Applicants", which accused several prominent people of usury. One of them, Major Carl Reinhold af Robsahm (1788-1860), had him indicted for defamation. He was found guilty and sentenced to pay a fine of 40 Riksdalers or spend fourteen days in jail on bread and water.

Possibly fearing for his life, he fled to Germany instead, where he presented himself as a "Royal Fencer" from Uppsala, and actually wrote a fencing textbook that was published by a company in Grimma. He also created portraits of prominent Swedes and scenes of Stockholm that were engraved by John Poppel (1807-1882) in Darmstadt. His stay in Germany ended when he became involved in some radical political movements and was forced to flee again; this time to Switzerland. He settled in Geneva in 1850.

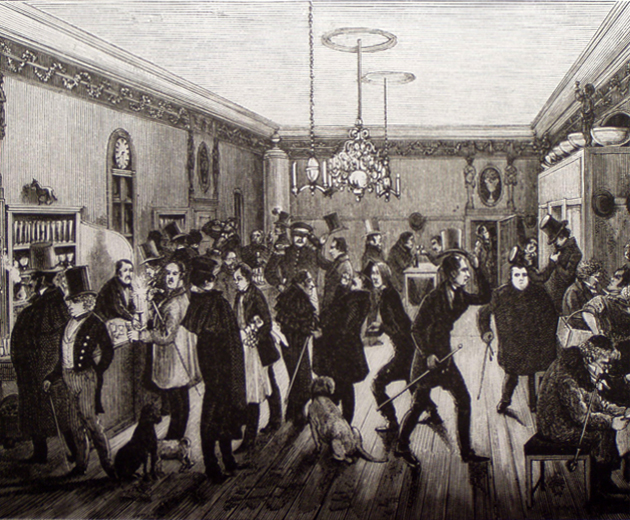
The "Cellar" at the Royal Swedish Opera. Tollin is at the counter, in the light-colored coat.

There, he published scenes of the city that were lithographed by Auguste Viande (1825-1887). He apparently moved every three months, when his residence permit had to be renewed, and applied for a visa to travel to France. In 1854, he was given permission for admittance to a nursing home. The nature of his problem is unknown. He was discharged two years later, heavily in debt, and left Geneva without stating his destination. There are no more records of him in Switzerland or elsewhere.
