= Bonde Palace =

Palace in Stockholm, Sweden

Coordinates: 59°19′34″N 18°03′59″E

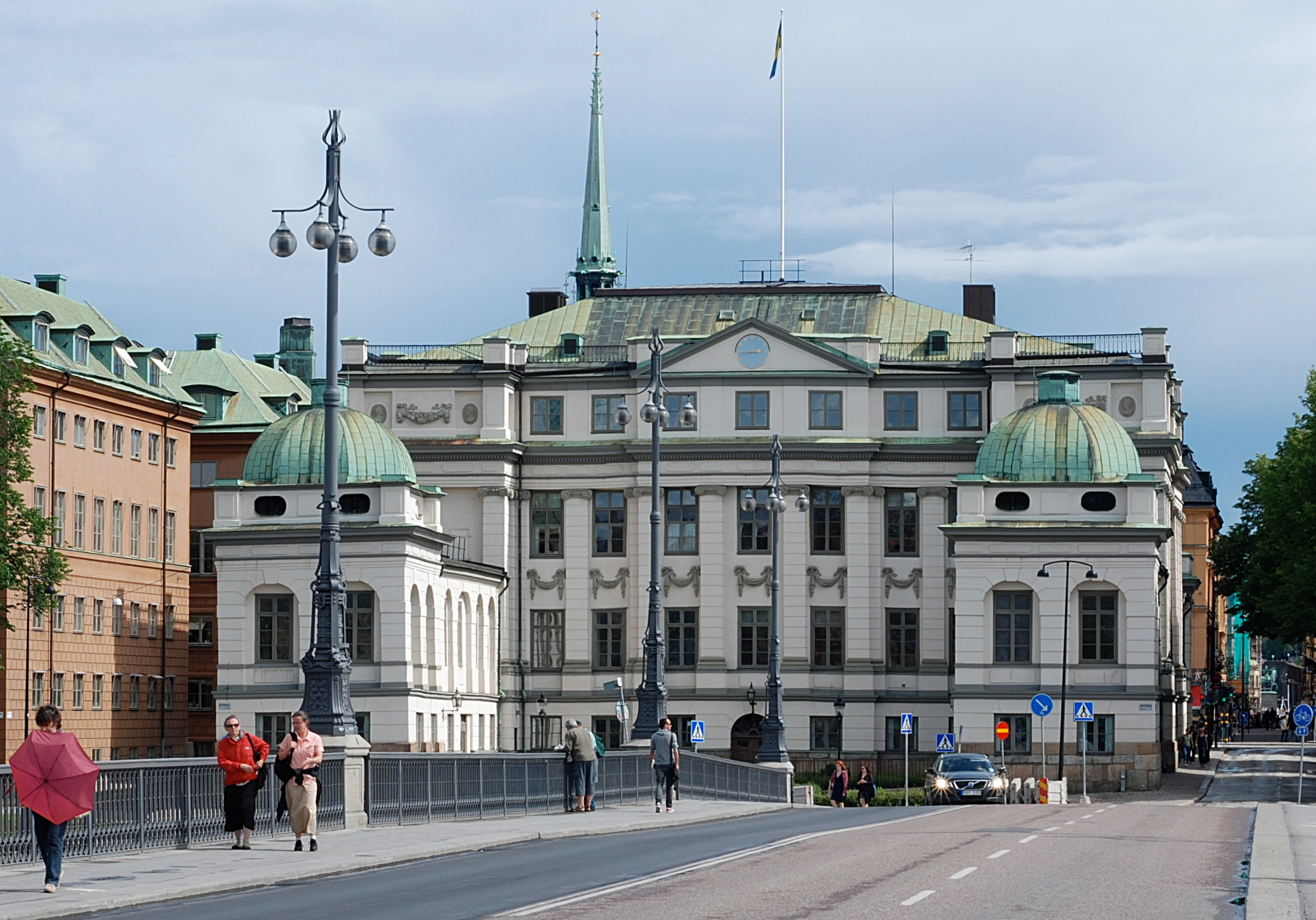
The Palace of Bonde, situated right next to the House of Knights, is the current seat of the Supreme Court of Sweden.

The Bonde Palace (Swedish: Bondeska palatset) is a palace in Gamla stan, the old town in central Stockholm, Sweden. Located between the House of Knights (Riddarhuset) and the Chancellery House (Kanslihuset), it is, arguably, the most prominent monument of the era of the Swedish Empire (1611–1718), originally designed by Nicodemus Tessin the Elder and Jean De la Vallée in 1662-1667 as the private residence of the Lord High Treasurer Gustaf Bonde (1620–1667) it still bears his name, while it accommodated the Stockholm Court House from the 18th century and since 1949 houses the Swedish Supreme Court. On the south side of the building is the street Myntgatan and the square Riddarhustorget, while the alleys Riddarhusgränd and Rådhusgränd are passing on its western and eastern sides.

== History ==
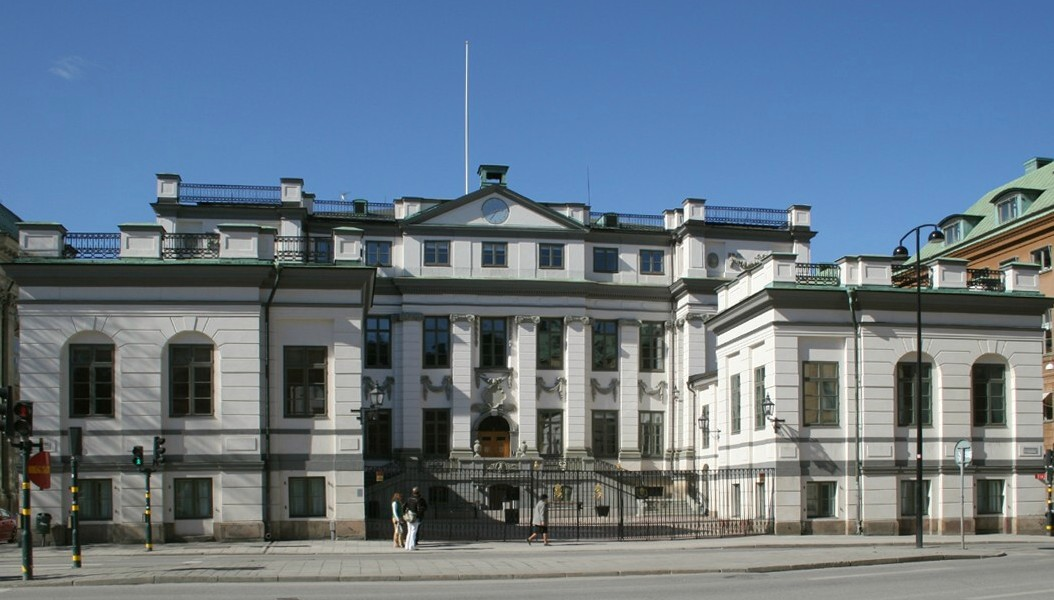
South side of the palace in February 2007

The original design by Simon de la Vallée and Tessin the Younger, based on French Baroque and Renaissance prototypes, was H-shaped in plan, the planned two southern wings flanking a main court, while the northern wings surrounded a small Baroque garden. The central building was covered by a tall steep-pitched, copper-dressed roof surrounded by the cupolas of the corner pavilions, while the façades were decorated with Ionic pilasters, festoons and portraits of Roman Emperors. The Reduction in 1680 (e.g. the Crown recapturing lands earlier granted the nobility) dramatically reduced the financial power of the Bonde dynasty, and therefore, following the devastating fire of the royal palace Tre Kronor in 1697, the Royal Library and the Svea Court of Appeal were lodged in the Bonde palace. The original elaborated roof was destroyed in a fire in 1710, the original cupolas, however, are still preserved on the northern wings. In 1730, the palace was finally bought by the city in order to relocate the Town Hall from the central square Stortorget, thus definitively ending the buildings history as a private palace.

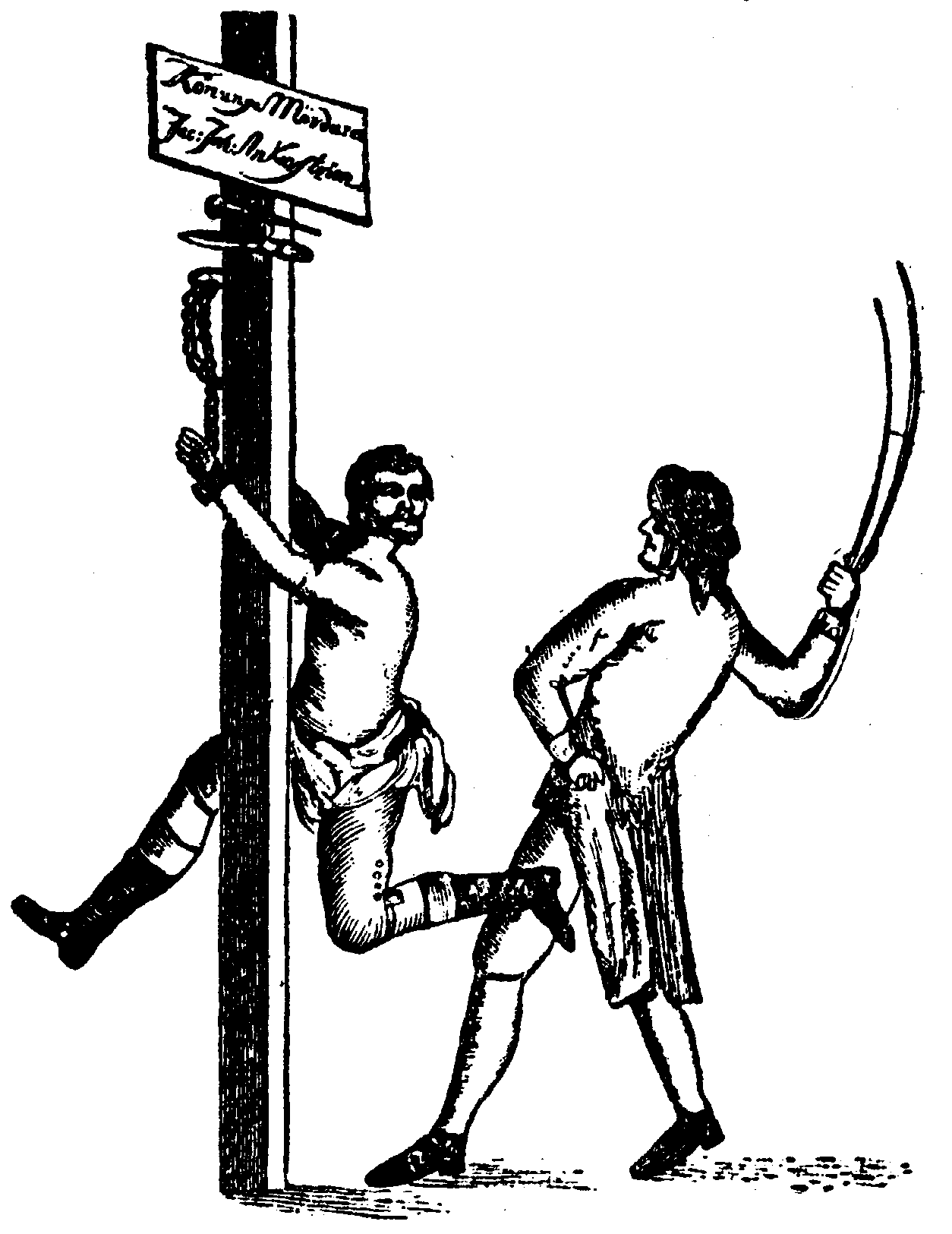
The flogging of Anckarström in front of the palace in 1792

The reconstruction following another fire in 1753 produced much of the present shape of the building; the design of Johan Eberhard Carlberg resulting in the construction of the southern wings to the original plans, the addition of a new top floor, and an up-to-date low hipped roof; the present interior still reflecting the taste of the mid 18th century. As a City Hall, the palace commenced its central role in Swedish legal history by witnessing several dramatic historical events, including the public flogging of Jacob Johan Anckarström in 1792, and the mob beating of statesman Axel von Fersen the Younger to death in 1810.

As the bridge Vasabron, extending the alley Riddarhusgränd between the Bonde Palace and the House Knights, was constructed in the 1870s, proposals were made to adapt the width of the narrow alley to that of the new bridge, plans effectively suggesting the demolition of the palace. The plans were, however, never carried through, and one of the bridge's roadways is forced to make a detour around the still intact palace. During the 19th century, the building gradually failed to accommodate the court house, and as a new court house was finally built on Kungsholmen in 1915, the palace was to accommodate various municipal offices instead, the gradual decay that followed resulting in a second proposed demolition in 1920. The building was however restored in 1925, using the original white colour of the façades.

In 1948, the building was transferred from the city to the state. A comprehensive restoration led by the architect Ivar Tengbom, including the reinforcement of the foundations, the replacement of the windows, and interior lightwells being used for installations, transformed the decayed structure to its present classical shape; the updated interiors designed by Carl Malmsten, however, making the interior connote the 1940s. Additional restorations in 1986 and 2003–2004, have carefully focused on the building's origin from the 17th and 18th centuries using original materials and craftsmanship as far as possible while adapting the offices of the Supreme Court to modern requirements regarding accessibility and security. The building is today classified as a historical monument of national interest administered and maintained by the Swedish National Property Board (Statens Fastighetsverk).

== See also ==
- Architecture of Stockholm
- History of Stockholm
