= Nicodemus Tessin the Elder =

Swedish architect (1615-1681)

Nicodemus Tessin den äldre
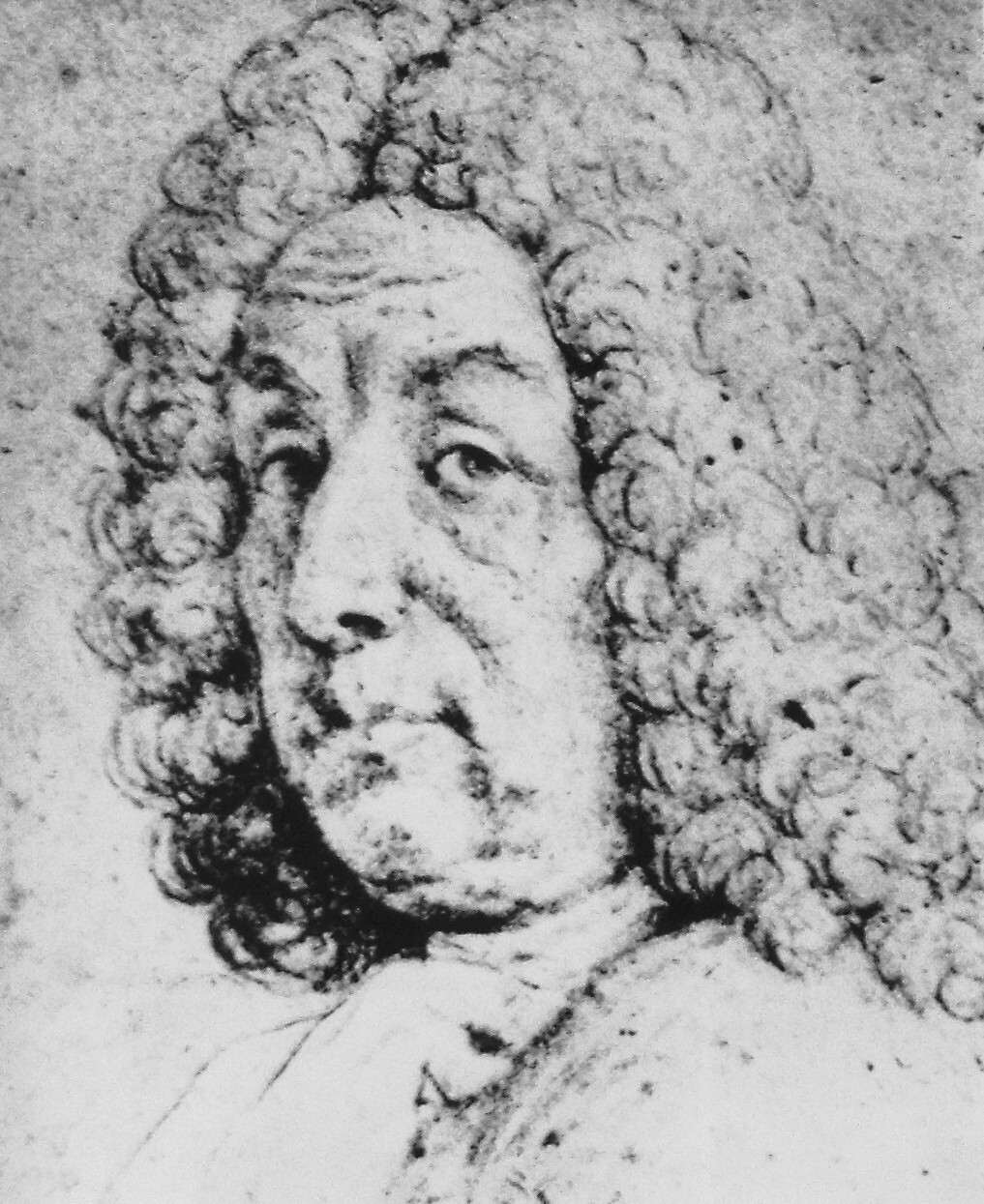
- Born: 7 December 1615; Stralsund, Pomerania
- Died: 24 May 1681 (aged 65); Stockholm
- Known for: Architecture, gardening
- Notable work: Drottningholm Palace, Wrangel Palace, Skokloster Castle

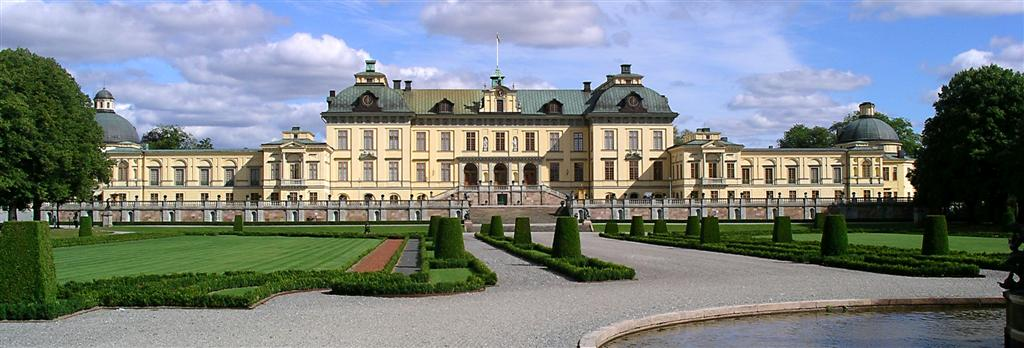
Drottningholm Palace.

Nicodemus Tessin the Elder (Swedish: Nicodemus Tessin den äldre) (7 December 1615 – 24 May 1681) was an important Swedish architect.

== Biography ==
Nicodemus Tessin was born in Stralsund in Pomerania and came to Sweden as a young man. There he met and worked with the architect Simon de la Vallée. He worked for the Swedish Chancellor Axel Oxenstierna before he travelled for further studies to Germany, Italy, France and in the Netherlands, where he got to know the new Baroque style in architecture. Back in Sweden he rebuilt Borgholm Castle, then built Skokloster Castle and the Wrangel Palace in Stockholm. His most important work was Drottningholm Palace, now a world heritage site.

Upon his death his son Nicodemus Tessin the Younger continued his projects.

== Selected works ==
- Borgholm Castle
- Drottningholm Palace
- Bonde Palace
- Skokloster Castle
- Strömsholm Palace
- Näsby castle
- Stenbock Palace
- Wrangel Palace
- Bååt Palace
- Kalmar Cathedral

== Literature ==
- K. Neville, Nicodemus Tessin the Elder. Architecture in Sweden in the Age of Greatness, Turnhout, Brepols Publishers, 2009, ISBN 978-2-503-52826-7

== See also ==
- Halltorps

== Gallery ==
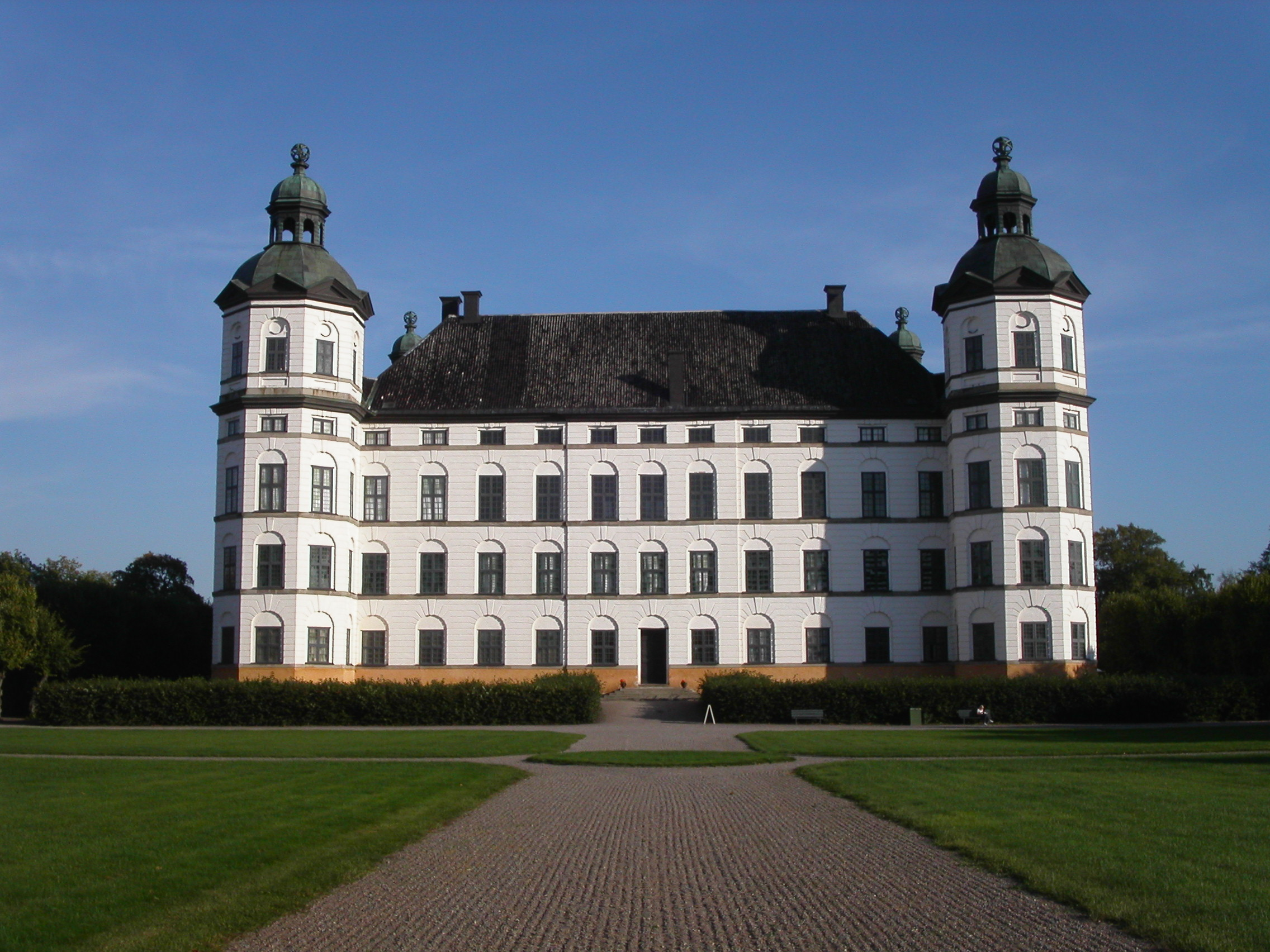
Skokloster Palace.

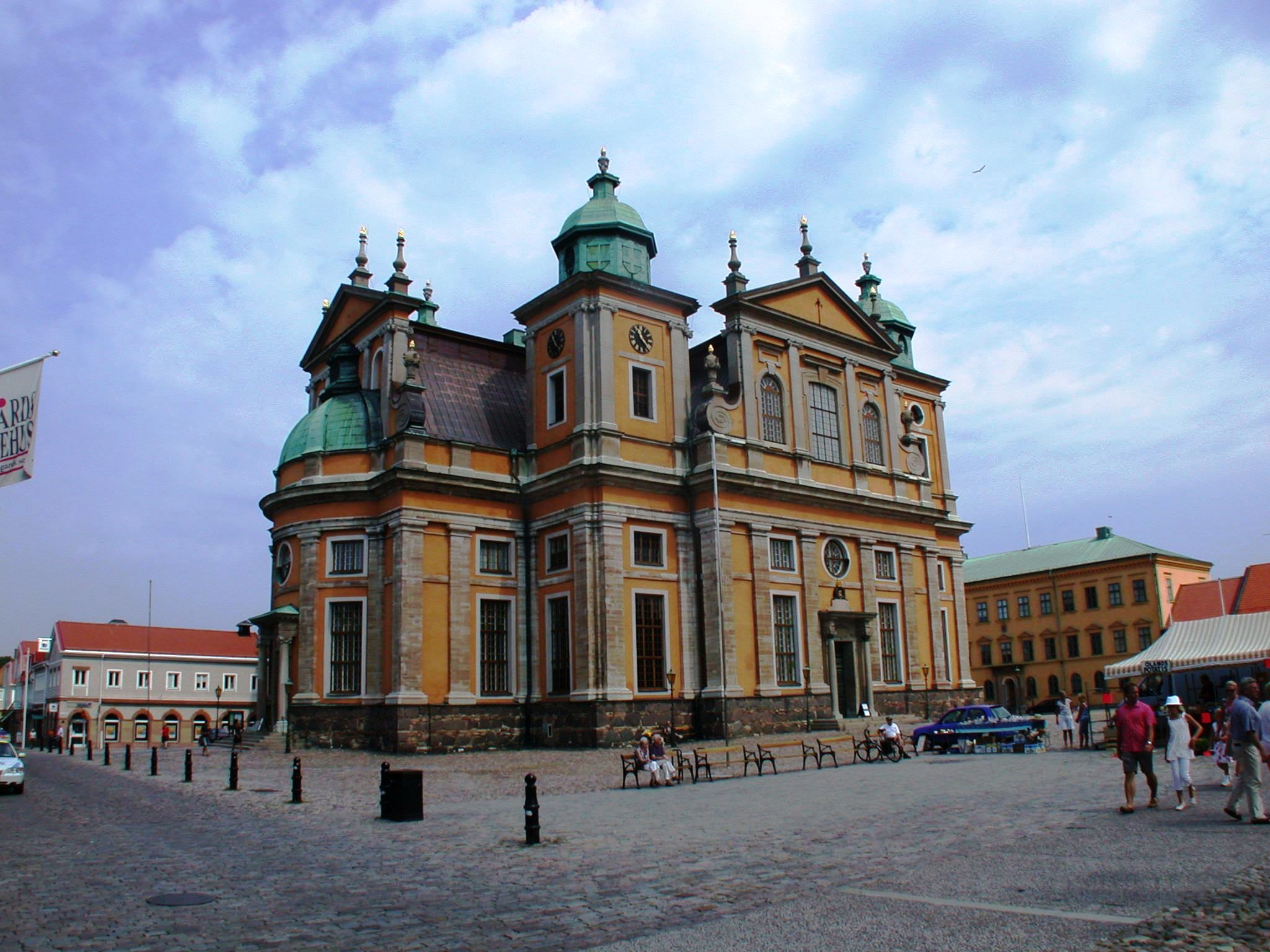
Kalmar Cathedral.
